

245001–245100 

|-bgcolor=#d6d6d6
| 245001 ||  || — || February 12, 2004 || Kitt Peak || Spacewatch || — || align=right | 2.4 km || 
|-id=002 bgcolor=#d6d6d6
| 245002 ||  || — || February 13, 2004 || Kitt Peak || Spacewatch || EOS || align=right | 2.8 km || 
|-id=003 bgcolor=#d6d6d6
| 245003 ||  || — || February 13, 2004 || Kitt Peak || Spacewatch || — || align=right | 4.8 km || 
|-id=004 bgcolor=#FA8072
| 245004 ||  || — || February 14, 2004 || Haleakala || NEAT || H || align=right | 1.1 km || 
|-id=005 bgcolor=#d6d6d6
| 245005 ||  || — || February 11, 2004 || Palomar || NEAT || — || align=right | 4.8 km || 
|-id=006 bgcolor=#d6d6d6
| 245006 ||  || — || February 10, 2004 || Palomar || NEAT || — || align=right | 3.4 km || 
|-id=007 bgcolor=#d6d6d6
| 245007 ||  || — || February 13, 2004 || Kitt Peak || Spacewatch || 3:2 || align=right | 6.8 km || 
|-id=008 bgcolor=#d6d6d6
| 245008 ||  || — || February 11, 2004 || Palomar || NEAT || — || align=right | 3.4 km || 
|-id=009 bgcolor=#d6d6d6
| 245009 ||  || — || February 14, 2004 || Kitt Peak || Spacewatch || — || align=right | 4.8 km || 
|-id=010 bgcolor=#d6d6d6
| 245010 ||  || — || February 14, 2004 || Kitt Peak || Spacewatch || — || align=right | 3.0 km || 
|-id=011 bgcolor=#d6d6d6
| 245011 ||  || — || February 14, 2004 || Kitt Peak || Spacewatch || — || align=right | 3.6 km || 
|-id=012 bgcolor=#d6d6d6
| 245012 ||  || — || February 14, 2004 || Kitt Peak || Spacewatch || — || align=right | 4.4 km || 
|-id=013 bgcolor=#d6d6d6
| 245013 ||  || — || February 15, 2004 || Socorro || LINEAR || — || align=right | 3.4 km || 
|-id=014 bgcolor=#d6d6d6
| 245014 ||  || — || February 14, 2004 || Kitt Peak || Spacewatch || TIR || align=right | 3.4 km || 
|-id=015 bgcolor=#d6d6d6
| 245015 ||  || — || February 14, 2004 || Socorro || LINEAR || EUP || align=right | 6.1 km || 
|-id=016 bgcolor=#d6d6d6
| 245016 ||  || — || February 18, 2004 || Desert Eagle || W. K. Y. Yeung || — || align=right | 6.5 km || 
|-id=017 bgcolor=#d6d6d6
| 245017 ||  || — || February 22, 2004 || Kitt Peak || Spacewatch || — || align=right | 3.3 km || 
|-id=018 bgcolor=#d6d6d6
| 245018 ||  || — || February 23, 2004 || Socorro || LINEAR || — || align=right | 3.6 km || 
|-id=019 bgcolor=#E9E9E9
| 245019 ||  || — || February 25, 2004 || Desert Eagle || W. K. Y. Yeung || — || align=right | 3.2 km || 
|-id=020 bgcolor=#d6d6d6
| 245020 ||  || — || February 26, 2004 || Socorro || LINEAR || — || align=right | 3.2 km || 
|-id=021 bgcolor=#d6d6d6
| 245021 ||  || — || February 23, 2004 || Socorro || LINEAR || EOS || align=right | 2.5 km || 
|-id=022 bgcolor=#d6d6d6
| 245022 ||  || — || February 23, 2004 || Socorro || LINEAR || — || align=right | 5.5 km || 
|-id=023 bgcolor=#E9E9E9
| 245023 ||  || — || February 26, 2004 || Kitt Peak || M. W. Buie || — || align=right | 4.3 km || 
|-id=024 bgcolor=#d6d6d6
| 245024 ||  || — || March 10, 2004 || Palomar || NEAT || EUP || align=right | 5.5 km || 
|-id=025 bgcolor=#d6d6d6
| 245025 ||  || — || March 14, 2004 || Kitt Peak || Spacewatch || EOS || align=right | 2.8 km || 
|-id=026 bgcolor=#d6d6d6
| 245026 ||  || — || March 11, 2004 || Palomar || NEAT || — || align=right | 3.4 km || 
|-id=027 bgcolor=#d6d6d6
| 245027 ||  || — || March 11, 2004 || Palomar || NEAT || HYG || align=right | 3.2 km || 
|-id=028 bgcolor=#d6d6d6
| 245028 ||  || — || March 12, 2004 || Palomar || NEAT || — || align=right | 6.3 km || 
|-id=029 bgcolor=#fefefe
| 245029 ||  || — || March 15, 2004 || Desert Eagle || W. K. Y. Yeung || NYS || align=right | 2.6 km || 
|-id=030 bgcolor=#d6d6d6
| 245030 ||  || — || March 15, 2004 || Socorro || LINEAR || — || align=right | 3.5 km || 
|-id=031 bgcolor=#E9E9E9
| 245031 ||  || — || March 15, 2004 || Kitt Peak || Spacewatch || — || align=right | 2.5 km || 
|-id=032 bgcolor=#d6d6d6
| 245032 ||  || — || March 15, 2004 || Kitt Peak || Spacewatch || — || align=right | 5.3 km || 
|-id=033 bgcolor=#d6d6d6
| 245033 ||  || — || March 14, 2004 || Palomar || NEAT || — || align=right | 3.4 km || 
|-id=034 bgcolor=#d6d6d6
| 245034 ||  || — || March 15, 2004 || Catalina || CSS || EOS || align=right | 2.5 km || 
|-id=035 bgcolor=#d6d6d6
| 245035 ||  || — || March 13, 2004 || Palomar || NEAT || EUP || align=right | 5.1 km || 
|-id=036 bgcolor=#d6d6d6
| 245036 ||  || — || March 15, 2004 || Kitt Peak || Spacewatch || EOS || align=right | 2.2 km || 
|-id=037 bgcolor=#d6d6d6
| 245037 ||  || — || March 14, 2004 || Kitt Peak || Spacewatch || THM || align=right | 2.6 km || 
|-id=038 bgcolor=#d6d6d6
| 245038 ||  || — || March 15, 2004 || Kitt Peak || Spacewatch || — || align=right | 3.9 km || 
|-id=039 bgcolor=#d6d6d6
| 245039 ||  || — || March 15, 2004 || Socorro || LINEAR || THM || align=right | 3.1 km || 
|-id=040 bgcolor=#d6d6d6
| 245040 ||  || — || March 15, 2004 || Socorro || LINEAR || — || align=right | 5.1 km || 
|-id=041 bgcolor=#d6d6d6
| 245041 ||  || — || March 14, 2004 || Kitt Peak || Spacewatch || — || align=right | 3.3 km || 
|-id=042 bgcolor=#E9E9E9
| 245042 ||  || — || March 16, 2004 || Socorro || LINEAR || — || align=right | 3.2 km || 
|-id=043 bgcolor=#d6d6d6
| 245043 ||  || — || March 16, 2004 || Socorro || LINEAR || — || align=right | 2.2 km || 
|-id=044 bgcolor=#d6d6d6
| 245044 ||  || — || March 17, 2004 || Socorro || LINEAR || — || align=right | 5.0 km || 
|-id=045 bgcolor=#d6d6d6
| 245045 ||  || — || March 17, 2004 || Kitt Peak || Spacewatch || — || align=right | 1.7 km || 
|-id=046 bgcolor=#fefefe
| 245046 ||  || — || March 30, 2004 || Socorro || LINEAR || H || align=right data-sort-value="0.91" | 910 m || 
|-id=047 bgcolor=#d6d6d6
| 245047 ||  || — || March 17, 2004 || Socorro || LINEAR || YAK || align=right | 3.6 km || 
|-id=048 bgcolor=#d6d6d6
| 245048 ||  || — || March 16, 2004 || Kitt Peak || Spacewatch || — || align=right | 3.2 km || 
|-id=049 bgcolor=#d6d6d6
| 245049 ||  || — || March 17, 2004 || Kitt Peak || Spacewatch || — || align=right | 4.0 km || 
|-id=050 bgcolor=#d6d6d6
| 245050 ||  || — || March 19, 2004 || Kitt Peak || Spacewatch || THM || align=right | 2.3 km || 
|-id=051 bgcolor=#d6d6d6
| 245051 ||  || — || March 22, 2004 || Socorro || LINEAR || — || align=right | 3.0 km || 
|-id=052 bgcolor=#d6d6d6
| 245052 ||  || — || March 18, 2004 || Kitt Peak || Spacewatch || — || align=right | 5.0 km || 
|-id=053 bgcolor=#d6d6d6
| 245053 ||  || — || March 22, 2004 || Socorro || LINEAR || — || align=right | 4.8 km || 
|-id=054 bgcolor=#d6d6d6
| 245054 ||  || — || March 23, 2004 || Socorro || LINEAR || — || align=right | 3.9 km || 
|-id=055 bgcolor=#d6d6d6
| 245055 ||  || — || March 19, 2004 || Socorro || LINEAR || HYG || align=right | 3.8 km || 
|-id=056 bgcolor=#d6d6d6
| 245056 ||  || — || March 20, 2004 || Socorro || LINEAR || — || align=right | 4.5 km || 
|-id=057 bgcolor=#d6d6d6
| 245057 ||  || — || March 20, 2004 || Socorro || LINEAR || — || align=right | 5.4 km || 
|-id=058 bgcolor=#d6d6d6
| 245058 ||  || — || March 23, 2004 || Kitt Peak || Spacewatch || EOS || align=right | 2.3 km || 
|-id=059 bgcolor=#fefefe
| 245059 ||  || — || March 24, 2004 || Catalina || CSS || H || align=right data-sort-value="0.82" | 820 m || 
|-id=060 bgcolor=#d6d6d6
| 245060 ||  || — || March 28, 2004 || Anderson Mesa || LONEOS || EUP || align=right | 5.3 km || 
|-id=061 bgcolor=#d6d6d6
| 245061 ||  || — || March 29, 2004 || Socorro || LINEAR || TIR || align=right | 4.1 km || 
|-id=062 bgcolor=#d6d6d6
| 245062 ||  || — || April 9, 2004 || Siding Spring || SSS || EOS || align=right | 2.8 km || 
|-id=063 bgcolor=#d6d6d6
| 245063 ||  || — || April 11, 2004 || Palomar || NEAT || — || align=right | 4.7 km || 
|-id=064 bgcolor=#d6d6d6
| 245064 ||  || — || April 12, 2004 || Kitt Peak || Spacewatch || VER || align=right | 3.4 km || 
|-id=065 bgcolor=#d6d6d6
| 245065 ||  || — || April 13, 2004 || Kitt Peak || Spacewatch || HYG || align=right | 4.0 km || 
|-id=066 bgcolor=#d6d6d6
| 245066 ||  || — || April 9, 2004 || Siding Spring || SSS || — || align=right | 3.6 km || 
|-id=067 bgcolor=#d6d6d6
| 245067 ||  || — || April 12, 2004 || Catalina || CSS || TIR || align=right | 4.1 km || 
|-id=068 bgcolor=#d6d6d6
| 245068 ||  || — || April 15, 2004 || Siding Spring || SSS || — || align=right | 4.8 km || 
|-id=069 bgcolor=#E9E9E9
| 245069 ||  || — || April 13, 2004 || Kitt Peak || Spacewatch || — || align=right | 2.4 km || 
|-id=070 bgcolor=#d6d6d6
| 245070 ||  || — || April 14, 2004 || Kitt Peak || Spacewatch || THM || align=right | 2.4 km || 
|-id=071 bgcolor=#d6d6d6
| 245071 ||  || — || April 15, 2004 || Anderson Mesa || LONEOS || — || align=right | 3.5 km || 
|-id=072 bgcolor=#d6d6d6
| 245072 ||  || — || April 13, 2004 || Kitt Peak || Spacewatch || — || align=right | 4.7 km || 
|-id=073 bgcolor=#d6d6d6
| 245073 ||  || — || April 15, 2004 || Socorro || LINEAR || — || align=right | 4.7 km || 
|-id=074 bgcolor=#d6d6d6
| 245074 ||  || — || April 16, 2004 || Socorro || LINEAR || EUP || align=right | 5.6 km || 
|-id=075 bgcolor=#d6d6d6
| 245075 ||  || — || April 19, 2004 || Socorro || LINEAR || — || align=right | 3.7 km || 
|-id=076 bgcolor=#d6d6d6
| 245076 ||  || — || April 25, 2004 || Kitt Peak || Spacewatch || — || align=right | 5.0 km || 
|-id=077 bgcolor=#d6d6d6
| 245077 ||  || — || May 10, 2004 || Reedy Creek || J. Broughton || — || align=right | 5.0 km || 
|-id=078 bgcolor=#d6d6d6
| 245078 ||  || — || May 13, 2004 || Kitt Peak || Spacewatch || — || align=right | 3.2 km || 
|-id=079 bgcolor=#d6d6d6
| 245079 ||  || — || May 15, 2004 || Siding Spring || SSS || — || align=right | 6.2 km || 
|-id=080 bgcolor=#d6d6d6
| 245080 ||  || — || June 11, 2004 || Socorro || LINEAR || — || align=right | 5.2 km || 
|-id=081 bgcolor=#fefefe
| 245081 ||  || — || June 20, 2004 || Socorro || LINEAR || PHO || align=right | 1.5 km || 
|-id=082 bgcolor=#E9E9E9
| 245082 ||  || — || July 10, 2004 || Catalina || CSS || — || align=right | 3.7 km || 
|-id=083 bgcolor=#d6d6d6
| 245083 ||  || — || July 11, 2004 || Socorro || LINEAR || — || align=right | 4.3 km || 
|-id=084 bgcolor=#fefefe
| 245084 ||  || — || July 14, 2004 || Socorro || LINEAR || — || align=right data-sort-value="0.83" | 830 m || 
|-id=085 bgcolor=#d6d6d6
| 245085 ||  || — || July 16, 2004 || Socorro || LINEAR || — || align=right | 4.5 km || 
|-id=086 bgcolor=#d6d6d6
| 245086 ||  || — || July 25, 2004 || Anderson Mesa || LONEOS || — || align=right | 5.8 km || 
|-id=087 bgcolor=#d6d6d6
| 245087 ||  || — || August 6, 2004 || Palomar || NEAT || — || align=right | 3.4 km || 
|-id=088 bgcolor=#fefefe
| 245088 ||  || — || August 6, 2004 || Palomar || NEAT || FLO || align=right | 1.1 km || 
|-id=089 bgcolor=#fefefe
| 245089 ||  || — || August 6, 2004 || Palomar || NEAT || — || align=right | 1.0 km || 
|-id=090 bgcolor=#fefefe
| 245090 ||  || — || August 6, 2004 || Palomar || NEAT || NYS || align=right | 1.9 km || 
|-id=091 bgcolor=#d6d6d6
| 245091 ||  || — || August 7, 2004 || Palomar || NEAT || — || align=right | 4.9 km || 
|-id=092 bgcolor=#d6d6d6
| 245092 ||  || — || August 7, 2004 || Palomar || NEAT || — || align=right | 6.1 km || 
|-id=093 bgcolor=#d6d6d6
| 245093 ||  || — || August 8, 2004 || Socorro || LINEAR || 3:2 || align=right | 8.2 km || 
|-id=094 bgcolor=#fefefe
| 245094 ||  || — || August 8, 2004 || Socorro || LINEAR || MAS || align=right | 1.1 km || 
|-id=095 bgcolor=#d6d6d6
| 245095 ||  || — || August 8, 2004 || Socorro || LINEAR || EUP || align=right | 7.5 km || 
|-id=096 bgcolor=#d6d6d6
| 245096 ||  || — || August 8, 2004 || Reedy Creek || J. Broughton || VER || align=right | 5.3 km || 
|-id=097 bgcolor=#fefefe
| 245097 ||  || — || August 8, 2004 || Socorro || LINEAR || — || align=right | 1.7 km || 
|-id=098 bgcolor=#fefefe
| 245098 ||  || — || August 8, 2004 || Anderson Mesa || LONEOS || — || align=right | 1.5 km || 
|-id=099 bgcolor=#E9E9E9
| 245099 ||  || — || August 9, 2004 || Socorro || LINEAR || ADE || align=right | 3.7 km || 
|-id=100 bgcolor=#E9E9E9
| 245100 ||  || — || August 9, 2004 || Anderson Mesa || LONEOS || ADE || align=right | 3.8 km || 
|}

245101–245200 

|-bgcolor=#fefefe
| 245101 ||  || — || August 9, 2004 || Anderson Mesa || LONEOS || V || align=right data-sort-value="0.82" | 820 m || 
|-id=102 bgcolor=#E9E9E9
| 245102 ||  || — || August 9, 2004 || Socorro || LINEAR || JUN || align=right | 4.7 km || 
|-id=103 bgcolor=#d6d6d6
| 245103 ||  || — || August 9, 2004 || Socorro || LINEAR || — || align=right | 5.0 km || 
|-id=104 bgcolor=#fefefe
| 245104 ||  || — || August 9, 2004 || Socorro || LINEAR || — || align=right | 1.7 km || 
|-id=105 bgcolor=#fefefe
| 245105 ||  || — || August 10, 2004 || Socorro || LINEAR || — || align=right | 1.1 km || 
|-id=106 bgcolor=#E9E9E9
| 245106 ||  || — || August 7, 2004 || Campo Imperatore || CINEOS || GER || align=right | 1.4 km || 
|-id=107 bgcolor=#fefefe
| 245107 ||  || — || August 9, 2004 || Socorro || LINEAR || V || align=right data-sort-value="0.84" | 840 m || 
|-id=108 bgcolor=#fefefe
| 245108 ||  || — || August 10, 2004 || Socorro || LINEAR || — || align=right data-sort-value="0.94" | 940 m || 
|-id=109 bgcolor=#d6d6d6
| 245109 ||  || — || August 10, 2004 || Campo Imperatore || CINEOS || HYG || align=right | 2.7 km || 
|-id=110 bgcolor=#d6d6d6
| 245110 ||  || — || August 15, 2004 || Pla D'Arguines || Pla D'Arguines Obs. || VER || align=right | 4.3 km || 
|-id=111 bgcolor=#d6d6d6
| 245111 ||  || — || August 8, 2004 || Socorro || LINEAR || VER || align=right | 5.2 km || 
|-id=112 bgcolor=#fefefe
| 245112 ||  || — || August 11, 2004 || Socorro || LINEAR || — || align=right | 2.0 km || 
|-id=113 bgcolor=#d6d6d6
| 245113 ||  || — || August 15, 2004 || Palomar || NEAT || — || align=right | 7.4 km || 
|-id=114 bgcolor=#E9E9E9
| 245114 ||  || — || August 8, 2004 || Palomar || NEAT || — || align=right | 1.4 km || 
|-id=115 bgcolor=#FA8072
| 245115 ||  || — || August 21, 2004 || Siding Spring || SSS || — || align=right data-sort-value="0.89" | 890 m || 
|-id=116 bgcolor=#d6d6d6
| 245116 ||  || — || August 21, 2004 || Siding Spring || SSS || EOS || align=right | 3.5 km || 
|-id=117 bgcolor=#fefefe
| 245117 ||  || — || August 21, 2004 || Catalina || CSS || — || align=right | 1.4 km || 
|-id=118 bgcolor=#fefefe
| 245118 ||  || — || August 20, 2004 || Socorro || LINEAR || — || align=right | 3.6 km || 
|-id=119 bgcolor=#d6d6d6
| 245119 ||  || — || August 20, 2004 || Catalina || CSS || — || align=right | 8.3 km || 
|-id=120 bgcolor=#fefefe
| 245120 ||  || — || August 23, 2004 || Kitt Peak || Spacewatch || FLO || align=right data-sort-value="0.88" | 880 m || 
|-id=121 bgcolor=#d6d6d6
| 245121 ||  || — || August 16, 2004 || Palomar || NEAT || — || align=right | 4.3 km || 
|-id=122 bgcolor=#E9E9E9
| 245122 ||  || — || September 4, 2004 || Palomar || NEAT || — || align=right | 4.6 km || 
|-id=123 bgcolor=#fefefe
| 245123 ||  || — || September 7, 2004 || Socorro || LINEAR || FLO || align=right data-sort-value="0.83" | 830 m || 
|-id=124 bgcolor=#E9E9E9
| 245124 ||  || — || September 8, 2004 || Socorro || LINEAR || — || align=right | 3.1 km || 
|-id=125 bgcolor=#d6d6d6
| 245125 ||  || — || September 8, 2004 || Socorro || LINEAR || — || align=right | 5.2 km || 
|-id=126 bgcolor=#fefefe
| 245126 ||  || — || September 8, 2004 || Socorro || LINEAR || — || align=right data-sort-value="0.92" | 920 m || 
|-id=127 bgcolor=#fefefe
| 245127 ||  || — || September 8, 2004 || Socorro || LINEAR || FLO || align=right data-sort-value="0.91" | 910 m || 
|-id=128 bgcolor=#fefefe
| 245128 ||  || — || September 8, 2004 || Socorro || LINEAR || — || align=right | 1.2 km || 
|-id=129 bgcolor=#fefefe
| 245129 ||  || — || September 8, 2004 || Socorro || LINEAR || FLO || align=right data-sort-value="0.91" | 910 m || 
|-id=130 bgcolor=#fefefe
| 245130 ||  || — || September 8, 2004 || Socorro || LINEAR || — || align=right data-sort-value="0.98" | 980 m || 
|-id=131 bgcolor=#fefefe
| 245131 ||  || — || September 8, 2004 || Socorro || LINEAR || V || align=right data-sort-value="0.92" | 920 m || 
|-id=132 bgcolor=#d6d6d6
| 245132 ||  || — || September 8, 2004 || Socorro || LINEAR || — || align=right | 4.7 km || 
|-id=133 bgcolor=#E9E9E9
| 245133 ||  || — || September 8, 2004 || Socorro || LINEAR || PAD || align=right | 3.4 km || 
|-id=134 bgcolor=#d6d6d6
| 245134 ||  || — || September 8, 2004 || Socorro || LINEAR || EOS || align=right | 3.5 km || 
|-id=135 bgcolor=#fefefe
| 245135 ||  || — || September 8, 2004 || Palomar || NEAT || V || align=right | 1.0 km || 
|-id=136 bgcolor=#fefefe
| 245136 ||  || — || September 8, 2004 || Palomar || NEAT || NYS || align=right | 2.2 km || 
|-id=137 bgcolor=#E9E9E9
| 245137 ||  || — || September 9, 2004 || Socorro || LINEAR || — || align=right | 3.2 km || 
|-id=138 bgcolor=#fefefe
| 245138 ||  || — || September 9, 2004 || Kitt Peak || Spacewatch || — || align=right data-sort-value="0.87" | 870 m || 
|-id=139 bgcolor=#fefefe
| 245139 ||  || — || September 11, 2004 || Socorro || LINEAR || — || align=right | 1.5 km || 
|-id=140 bgcolor=#fefefe
| 245140 ||  || — || September 10, 2004 || Kitt Peak || Spacewatch || — || align=right | 1.2 km || 
|-id=141 bgcolor=#fefefe
| 245141 ||  || — || September 12, 2004 || Socorro || LINEAR || NYS || align=right data-sort-value="0.94" | 940 m || 
|-id=142 bgcolor=#d6d6d6
| 245142 ||  || — || September 9, 2004 || Anderson Mesa || LONEOS || — || align=right | 5.0 km || 
|-id=143 bgcolor=#d6d6d6
| 245143 ||  || — || September 9, 2004 || Anderson Mesa || LONEOS || — || align=right | 4.2 km || 
|-id=144 bgcolor=#E9E9E9
| 245144 ||  || — || September 15, 2004 || 7300 Observatory || W. K. Y. Yeung || — || align=right | 3.6 km || 
|-id=145 bgcolor=#fefefe
| 245145 ||  || — || September 10, 2004 || Socorro || LINEAR || V || align=right | 1.0 km || 
|-id=146 bgcolor=#fefefe
| 245146 ||  || — || September 14, 2004 || Socorro || LINEAR || V || align=right data-sort-value="0.89" | 890 m || 
|-id=147 bgcolor=#E9E9E9
| 245147 ||  || — || September 13, 2004 || Socorro || LINEAR || — || align=right | 3.3 km || 
|-id=148 bgcolor=#fefefe
| 245148 ||  || — || September 15, 2004 || Anderson Mesa || LONEOS || — || align=right | 1.0 km || 
|-id=149 bgcolor=#fefefe
| 245149 ||  || — || September 14, 2004 || Palomar || NEAT || — || align=right data-sort-value="0.90" | 900 m || 
|-id=150 bgcolor=#E9E9E9
| 245150 ||  || — || September 14, 2004 || Palomar || NEAT || JUN || align=right | 1.2 km || 
|-id=151 bgcolor=#fefefe
| 245151 ||  || — || September 15, 2004 || Kitt Peak || Spacewatch || FLO || align=right data-sort-value="0.84" | 840 m || 
|-id=152 bgcolor=#d6d6d6
| 245152 ||  || — || September 7, 2004 || Socorro || LINEAR || THM || align=right | 3.6 km || 
|-id=153 bgcolor=#fefefe
| 245153 ||  || — || September 17, 2004 || Socorro || LINEAR || — || align=right data-sort-value="0.80" | 800 m || 
|-id=154 bgcolor=#E9E9E9
| 245154 ||  || — || September 17, 2004 || Anderson Mesa || LONEOS || — || align=right | 2.4 km || 
|-id=155 bgcolor=#fefefe
| 245155 ||  || — || September 17, 2004 || Anderson Mesa || LONEOS || FLO || align=right | 1.5 km || 
|-id=156 bgcolor=#fefefe
| 245156 ||  || — || September 17, 2004 || Kitt Peak || Spacewatch || NYS || align=right data-sort-value="0.84" | 840 m || 
|-id=157 bgcolor=#fefefe
| 245157 ||  || — || October 4, 2004 || Kitt Peak || Spacewatch || — || align=right data-sort-value="0.62" | 620 m || 
|-id=158 bgcolor=#fefefe
| 245158 Thomasandrews ||  ||  || October 13, 2004 || Jarnac || T. Glinos, D. H. Levy || — || align=right data-sort-value="0.96" | 960 m || 
|-id=159 bgcolor=#fefefe
| 245159 ||  || — || October 4, 2004 || Kitt Peak || Spacewatch || V || align=right data-sort-value="0.72" | 720 m || 
|-id=160 bgcolor=#fefefe
| 245160 ||  || — || October 4, 2004 || Anderson Mesa || LONEOS || V || align=right | 1.0 km || 
|-id=161 bgcolor=#fefefe
| 245161 ||  || — || October 4, 2004 || Kitt Peak || Spacewatch || — || align=right | 1.4 km || 
|-id=162 bgcolor=#fefefe
| 245162 ||  || — || October 4, 2004 || Kitt Peak || Spacewatch || V || align=right data-sort-value="0.84" | 840 m || 
|-id=163 bgcolor=#fefefe
| 245163 ||  || — || October 5, 2004 || Palomar || NEAT || — || align=right | 1.7 km || 
|-id=164 bgcolor=#fefefe
| 245164 ||  || — || October 5, 2004 || Kitt Peak || Spacewatch || — || align=right | 1.6 km || 
|-id=165 bgcolor=#fefefe
| 245165 ||  || — || October 5, 2004 || Kitt Peak || Spacewatch || — || align=right | 1.1 km || 
|-id=166 bgcolor=#fefefe
| 245166 ||  || — || October 6, 2004 || Kitt Peak || Spacewatch || — || align=right | 1.3 km || 
|-id=167 bgcolor=#fefefe
| 245167 ||  || — || October 7, 2004 || Kitt Peak || Spacewatch || — || align=right | 1.2 km || 
|-id=168 bgcolor=#fefefe
| 245168 ||  || — || October 7, 2004 || Kitt Peak || Spacewatch || V || align=right data-sort-value="0.91" | 910 m || 
|-id=169 bgcolor=#fefefe
| 245169 ||  || — || October 7, 2004 || Anderson Mesa || LONEOS || ERI || align=right | 2.3 km || 
|-id=170 bgcolor=#fefefe
| 245170 ||  || — || October 4, 2004 || Apache Point || Apache Point Obs. || — || align=right | 1.1 km || 
|-id=171 bgcolor=#fefefe
| 245171 ||  || — || October 4, 2004 || Anderson Mesa || LONEOS || V || align=right data-sort-value="0.93" | 930 m || 
|-id=172 bgcolor=#E9E9E9
| 245172 ||  || — || October 7, 2004 || Socorro || LINEAR || — || align=right | 2.2 km || 
|-id=173 bgcolor=#E9E9E9
| 245173 ||  || — || October 8, 2004 || Anderson Mesa || LONEOS || — || align=right | 1.7 km || 
|-id=174 bgcolor=#fefefe
| 245174 ||  || — || October 8, 2004 || Anderson Mesa || LONEOS || — || align=right | 1.5 km || 
|-id=175 bgcolor=#E9E9E9
| 245175 ||  || — || October 8, 2004 || Anderson Mesa || LONEOS || — || align=right | 2.5 km || 
|-id=176 bgcolor=#fefefe
| 245176 ||  || — || October 8, 2004 || Anderson Mesa || LONEOS || V || align=right | 1.2 km || 
|-id=177 bgcolor=#E9E9E9
| 245177 ||  || — || October 8, 2004 || Palomar || NEAT || — || align=right | 2.8 km || 
|-id=178 bgcolor=#E9E9E9
| 245178 ||  || — || October 4, 2004 || Kitt Peak || Spacewatch || XIZ || align=right | 2.2 km || 
|-id=179 bgcolor=#E9E9E9
| 245179 ||  || — || October 8, 2004 || Socorro || LINEAR || — || align=right | 3.8 km || 
|-id=180 bgcolor=#d6d6d6
| 245180 ||  || — || October 8, 2004 || Socorro || LINEAR || SYL7:4 || align=right | 8.4 km || 
|-id=181 bgcolor=#fefefe
| 245181 ||  || — || October 9, 2004 || Socorro || LINEAR || NYS || align=right | 1.1 km || 
|-id=182 bgcolor=#fefefe
| 245182 ||  || — || October 7, 2004 || Kitt Peak || Spacewatch || V || align=right data-sort-value="0.68" | 680 m || 
|-id=183 bgcolor=#fefefe
| 245183 ||  || — || October 8, 2004 || Kitt Peak || Spacewatch || NYS || align=right data-sort-value="0.83" | 830 m || 
|-id=184 bgcolor=#fefefe
| 245184 ||  || — || October 9, 2004 || Kitt Peak || Spacewatch || — || align=right data-sort-value="0.96" | 960 m || 
|-id=185 bgcolor=#fefefe
| 245185 ||  || — || October 7, 2004 || Socorro || LINEAR || — || align=right | 1.2 km || 
|-id=186 bgcolor=#fefefe
| 245186 ||  || — || October 9, 2004 || Socorro || LINEAR || — || align=right data-sort-value="0.85" | 850 m || 
|-id=187 bgcolor=#fefefe
| 245187 ||  || — || October 9, 2004 || Kitt Peak || Spacewatch || — || align=right | 1.2 km || 
|-id=188 bgcolor=#fefefe
| 245188 ||  || — || October 9, 2004 || Kitt Peak || Spacewatch || NYS || align=right data-sort-value="0.90" | 900 m || 
|-id=189 bgcolor=#E9E9E9
| 245189 ||  || — || October 9, 2004 || Kitt Peak || Spacewatch || — || align=right | 1.3 km || 
|-id=190 bgcolor=#fefefe
| 245190 ||  || — || October 7, 2004 || Anderson Mesa || LONEOS || — || align=right | 3.1 km || 
|-id=191 bgcolor=#fefefe
| 245191 ||  || — || October 9, 2004 || Socorro || LINEAR || FLO || align=right data-sort-value="0.98" | 980 m || 
|-id=192 bgcolor=#fefefe
| 245192 ||  || — || October 9, 2004 || Kitt Peak || Spacewatch || — || align=right | 2.2 km || 
|-id=193 bgcolor=#E9E9E9
| 245193 ||  || — || October 13, 2004 || Kitt Peak || Spacewatch || — || align=right | 1.3 km || 
|-id=194 bgcolor=#fefefe
| 245194 ||  || — || October 8, 2004 || Anderson Mesa || LONEOS || — || align=right | 1.3 km || 
|-id=195 bgcolor=#fefefe
| 245195 ||  || — || October 10, 2004 || Kitt Peak || Spacewatch || — || align=right | 2.9 km || 
|-id=196 bgcolor=#fefefe
| 245196 ||  || — || October 12, 2004 || Kitt Peak || Spacewatch || — || align=right data-sort-value="0.97" | 970 m || 
|-id=197 bgcolor=#fefefe
| 245197 ||  || — || October 9, 2004 || Kitt Peak || Spacewatch || NYS || align=right | 1.6 km || 
|-id=198 bgcolor=#E9E9E9
| 245198 ||  || — || October 13, 2004 || Anderson Mesa || LONEOS || ADE || align=right | 2.4 km || 
|-id=199 bgcolor=#fefefe
| 245199 ||  || — || October 7, 2004 || Socorro || LINEAR || — || align=right | 1.5 km || 
|-id=200 bgcolor=#fefefe
| 245200 ||  || — || October 18, 2004 || Socorro || LINEAR || FLO || align=right data-sort-value="0.92" | 920 m || 
|}

245201–245300 

|-bgcolor=#E9E9E9
| 245201 ||  || — || October 16, 2004 || Socorro || LINEAR || MAR || align=right | 1.7 km || 
|-id=202 bgcolor=#fefefe
| 245202 ||  || — || October 23, 2004 || Socorro || LINEAR || — || align=right | 1.4 km || 
|-id=203 bgcolor=#E9E9E9
| 245203 ||  || — || November 3, 2004 || Anderson Mesa || LONEOS || ADE || align=right | 2.9 km || 
|-id=204 bgcolor=#E9E9E9
| 245204 ||  || — || November 3, 2004 || Kitt Peak || Spacewatch || HEN || align=right | 1.5 km || 
|-id=205 bgcolor=#fefefe
| 245205 ||  || — || November 1, 2004 || Palomar || NEAT || FLO || align=right | 1.1 km || 
|-id=206 bgcolor=#fefefe
| 245206 ||  || — || November 4, 2004 || Anderson Mesa || LONEOS || FLO || align=right | 1.1 km || 
|-id=207 bgcolor=#fefefe
| 245207 ||  || — || November 4, 2004 || Catalina || CSS || NYS || align=right data-sort-value="0.86" | 860 m || 
|-id=208 bgcolor=#fefefe
| 245208 ||  || — || November 4, 2004 || Kitt Peak || Spacewatch || MAS || align=right data-sort-value="0.90" | 900 m || 
|-id=209 bgcolor=#E9E9E9
| 245209 ||  || — || November 4, 2004 || Catalina || CSS || EUN || align=right | 1.7 km || 
|-id=210 bgcolor=#E9E9E9
| 245210 ||  || — || November 5, 2004 || Palomar || NEAT || — || align=right | 2.5 km || 
|-id=211 bgcolor=#E9E9E9
| 245211 ||  || — || November 7, 2004 || Socorro || LINEAR || — || align=right | 2.0 km || 
|-id=212 bgcolor=#fefefe
| 245212 ||  || — || November 10, 2004 || Kitt Peak || Spacewatch || V || align=right data-sort-value="0.92" | 920 m || 
|-id=213 bgcolor=#d6d6d6
| 245213 ||  || — || November 11, 2004 || Anderson Mesa || LONEOS || — || align=right | 3.5 km || 
|-id=214 bgcolor=#E9E9E9
| 245214 ||  || — || November 19, 2004 || Socorro || LINEAR || — || align=right | 3.0 km || 
|-id=215 bgcolor=#FA8072
| 245215 ||  || — || November 16, 2004 || Siding Spring || SSS || PHO || align=right | 1.7 km || 
|-id=216 bgcolor=#d6d6d6
| 245216 ||  || — || December 2, 2004 || Catalina || CSS || 3:2 || align=right | 9.1 km || 
|-id=217 bgcolor=#E9E9E9
| 245217 ||  || — || December 8, 2004 || Socorro || LINEAR || MAR || align=right | 1.7 km || 
|-id=218 bgcolor=#fefefe
| 245218 ||  || — || December 8, 2004 || Socorro || LINEAR || — || align=right | 1.2 km || 
|-id=219 bgcolor=#fefefe
| 245219 ||  || — || December 8, 2004 || Socorro || LINEAR || V || align=right | 1.1 km || 
|-id=220 bgcolor=#fefefe
| 245220 ||  || — || December 8, 2004 || Socorro || LINEAR || — || align=right | 1.4 km || 
|-id=221 bgcolor=#E9E9E9
| 245221 ||  || — || December 10, 2004 || Catalina || CSS || BRU || align=right | 4.2 km || 
|-id=222 bgcolor=#d6d6d6
| 245222 ||  || — || December 7, 2004 || Socorro || LINEAR || BRA || align=right | 2.5 km || 
|-id=223 bgcolor=#fefefe
| 245223 ||  || — || December 10, 2004 || Socorro || LINEAR || NYS || align=right data-sort-value="0.82" | 820 m || 
|-id=224 bgcolor=#fefefe
| 245224 ||  || — || December 10, 2004 || Kitt Peak || Spacewatch || NYS || align=right | 2.0 km || 
|-id=225 bgcolor=#E9E9E9
| 245225 ||  || — || December 10, 2004 || Socorro || LINEAR || — || align=right | 1.1 km || 
|-id=226 bgcolor=#fefefe
| 245226 ||  || — || December 10, 2004 || Socorro || LINEAR || — || align=right data-sort-value="0.77" | 770 m || 
|-id=227 bgcolor=#E9E9E9
| 245227 ||  || — || December 11, 2004 || Kitt Peak || Spacewatch || — || align=right | 3.0 km || 
|-id=228 bgcolor=#E9E9E9
| 245228 ||  || — || December 12, 2004 || Kitt Peak || Spacewatch || — || align=right | 1.7 km || 
|-id=229 bgcolor=#E9E9E9
| 245229 ||  || — || December 12, 2004 || Kitt Peak || Spacewatch || — || align=right | 2.1 km || 
|-id=230 bgcolor=#fefefe
| 245230 ||  || — || December 11, 2004 || Socorro || LINEAR || — || align=right | 1.3 km || 
|-id=231 bgcolor=#fefefe
| 245231 ||  || — || December 10, 2004 || Kitt Peak || Spacewatch || FLO || align=right data-sort-value="0.98" | 980 m || 
|-id=232 bgcolor=#d6d6d6
| 245232 ||  || — || December 12, 2004 || Kitt Peak || Spacewatch || — || align=right | 2.7 km || 
|-id=233 bgcolor=#E9E9E9
| 245233 ||  || — || December 12, 2004 || Socorro || LINEAR || JUN || align=right | 1.7 km || 
|-id=234 bgcolor=#E9E9E9
| 245234 ||  || — || December 13, 2004 || Kitt Peak || Spacewatch || — || align=right | 1.8 km || 
|-id=235 bgcolor=#d6d6d6
| 245235 ||  || — || December 14, 2004 || Catalina || CSS || — || align=right | 3.3 km || 
|-id=236 bgcolor=#FA8072
| 245236 ||  || — || December 9, 2004 || Catalina || CSS || — || align=right | 1.6 km || 
|-id=237 bgcolor=#fefefe
| 245237 ||  || — || December 14, 2004 || Catalina || CSS || PHO || align=right | 3.8 km || 
|-id=238 bgcolor=#E9E9E9
| 245238 ||  || — || December 15, 2004 || Socorro || LINEAR || — || align=right | 4.0 km || 
|-id=239 bgcolor=#d6d6d6
| 245239 ||  || — || December 14, 2004 || Socorro || LINEAR || — || align=right | 5.3 km || 
|-id=240 bgcolor=#E9E9E9
| 245240 ||  || — || December 14, 2004 || Socorro || LINEAR || — || align=right | 3.7 km || 
|-id=241 bgcolor=#E9E9E9
| 245241 ||  || — || December 14, 2004 || Kitt Peak || Spacewatch || ADE || align=right | 2.4 km || 
|-id=242 bgcolor=#E9E9E9
| 245242 ||  || — || December 15, 2004 || Socorro || LINEAR || — || align=right | 1.4 km || 
|-id=243 bgcolor=#E9E9E9
| 245243 ||  || — || December 15, 2004 || Socorro || LINEAR || RAF || align=right | 1.5 km || 
|-id=244 bgcolor=#E9E9E9
| 245244 ||  || — || December 15, 2004 || Kitt Peak || Spacewatch || HOF || align=right | 3.7 km || 
|-id=245 bgcolor=#E9E9E9
| 245245 ||  || — || December 15, 2004 || Catalina || CSS || — || align=right | 2.4 km || 
|-id=246 bgcolor=#d6d6d6
| 245246 ||  || — || December 14, 2004 || Kitt Peak || Spacewatch || — || align=right | 4.0 km || 
|-id=247 bgcolor=#E9E9E9
| 245247 ||  || — || December 17, 2004 || Socorro || LINEAR || — || align=right | 2.7 km || 
|-id=248 bgcolor=#fefefe
| 245248 ||  || — || December 16, 2004 || Catalina || CSS || H || align=right | 1.2 km || 
|-id=249 bgcolor=#fefefe
| 245249 ||  || — || December 18, 2004 || Socorro || LINEAR || PHO || align=right | 3.7 km || 
|-id=250 bgcolor=#E9E9E9
| 245250 ||  || — || December 16, 2004 || Anderson Mesa || LONEOS || EUN || align=right | 2.3 km || 
|-id=251 bgcolor=#E9E9E9
| 245251 ||  || — || December 16, 2004 || Kitt Peak || Spacewatch || AGN || align=right | 1.6 km || 
|-id=252 bgcolor=#E9E9E9
| 245252 ||  || — || December 19, 2004 || Mount Lemmon || Mount Lemmon Survey || RAF || align=right | 1.4 km || 
|-id=253 bgcolor=#fefefe
| 245253 ||  || — || December 18, 2004 || Socorro || LINEAR || — || align=right | 1.3 km || 
|-id=254 bgcolor=#fefefe
| 245254 ||  || — || December 16, 2004 || Anderson Mesa || LONEOS || — || align=right | 1.2 km || 
|-id=255 bgcolor=#E9E9E9
| 245255 ||  || — || January 1, 2005 || Catalina || CSS || — || align=right | 1.6 km || 
|-id=256 bgcolor=#d6d6d6
| 245256 ||  || — || January 6, 2005 || Catalina || CSS || — || align=right | 3.1 km || 
|-id=257 bgcolor=#E9E9E9
| 245257 ||  || — || January 6, 2005 || Catalina || CSS || — || align=right | 2.0 km || 
|-id=258 bgcolor=#E9E9E9
| 245258 ||  || — || January 7, 2005 || Socorro || LINEAR || — || align=right | 3.3 km || 
|-id=259 bgcolor=#E9E9E9
| 245259 ||  || — || January 6, 2005 || Socorro || LINEAR || — || align=right | 3.0 km || 
|-id=260 bgcolor=#E9E9E9
| 245260 ||  || — || January 6, 2005 || Catalina || CSS || — || align=right | 4.0 km || 
|-id=261 bgcolor=#E9E9E9
| 245261 ||  || — || January 6, 2005 || Catalina || CSS || ADE || align=right | 3.1 km || 
|-id=262 bgcolor=#fefefe
| 245262 ||  || — || January 11, 2005 || Socorro || LINEAR || — || align=right | 1.3 km || 
|-id=263 bgcolor=#fefefe
| 245263 ||  || — || January 14, 2005 || Kvistaberg || UDAS || — || align=right | 1.3 km || 
|-id=264 bgcolor=#E9E9E9
| 245264 ||  || — || January 15, 2005 || Socorro || LINEAR || ADE || align=right | 3.0 km || 
|-id=265 bgcolor=#fefefe
| 245265 ||  || — || January 15, 2005 || Socorro || LINEAR || — || align=right data-sort-value="0.99" | 990 m || 
|-id=266 bgcolor=#d6d6d6
| 245266 ||  || — || January 13, 2005 || Kitt Peak || Spacewatch || THM || align=right | 3.3 km || 
|-id=267 bgcolor=#d6d6d6
| 245267 ||  || — || January 15, 2005 || Catalina || CSS || — || align=right | 4.6 km || 
|-id=268 bgcolor=#E9E9E9
| 245268 ||  || — || January 15, 2005 || Catalina || CSS || — || align=right | 3.6 km || 
|-id=269 bgcolor=#E9E9E9
| 245269 ||  || — || January 15, 2005 || Kitt Peak || Spacewatch || — || align=right | 3.9 km || 
|-id=270 bgcolor=#E9E9E9
| 245270 ||  || — || January 15, 2005 || Kitt Peak || Spacewatch || MIT || align=right | 3.0 km || 
|-id=271 bgcolor=#fefefe
| 245271 ||  || — || January 9, 2005 || Kvistaberg || UDAS || NYS || align=right data-sort-value="0.97" | 970 m || 
|-id=272 bgcolor=#E9E9E9
| 245272 ||  || — || January 16, 2005 || Desert Eagle || W. K. Y. Yeung || — || align=right | 1.6 km || 
|-id=273 bgcolor=#E9E9E9
| 245273 ||  || — || January 16, 2005 || Desert Eagle || W. K. Y. Yeung || — || align=right | 2.6 km || 
|-id=274 bgcolor=#E9E9E9
| 245274 ||  || — || January 16, 2005 || Socorro || LINEAR || — || align=right | 3.1 km || 
|-id=275 bgcolor=#E9E9E9
| 245275 ||  || — || January 16, 2005 || Kitt Peak || Spacewatch || — || align=right | 2.0 km || 
|-id=276 bgcolor=#d6d6d6
| 245276 ||  || — || January 16, 2005 || Socorro || LINEAR || — || align=right | 4.4 km || 
|-id=277 bgcolor=#d6d6d6
| 245277 ||  || — || January 16, 2005 || Socorro || LINEAR || EUP || align=right | 4.5 km || 
|-id=278 bgcolor=#E9E9E9
| 245278 ||  || — || January 17, 2005 || Socorro || LINEAR || — || align=right | 3.4 km || 
|-id=279 bgcolor=#C2FFFF
| 245279 ||  || — || January 16, 2005 || Mauna Kea || C. Veillet || L5 || align=right | 14 km || 
|-id=280 bgcolor=#d6d6d6
| 245280 ||  || — || January 17, 2005 || La Silla || A. Boattini, H. Scholl || — || align=right | 4.4 km || 
|-id=281 bgcolor=#E9E9E9
| 245281 ||  || — || February 1, 2005 || Palomar || NEAT || GEF || align=right | 2.1 km || 
|-id=282 bgcolor=#E9E9E9
| 245282 ||  || — || February 1, 2005 || Catalina || CSS || — || align=right | 1.1 km || 
|-id=283 bgcolor=#E9E9E9
| 245283 ||  || — || February 3, 2005 || Palomar || NEAT || — || align=right | 4.4 km || 
|-id=284 bgcolor=#E9E9E9
| 245284 ||  || — || February 1, 2005 || Kitt Peak || Spacewatch || — || align=right | 1.3 km || 
|-id=285 bgcolor=#E9E9E9
| 245285 ||  || — || February 1, 2005 || Catalina || CSS || — || align=right | 2.2 km || 
|-id=286 bgcolor=#fefefe
| 245286 ||  || — || February 1, 2005 || Kitt Peak || Spacewatch || — || align=right | 2.9 km || 
|-id=287 bgcolor=#E9E9E9
| 245287 ||  || — || February 2, 2005 || Socorro || LINEAR || — || align=right | 1.6 km || 
|-id=288 bgcolor=#E9E9E9
| 245288 ||  || — || February 2, 2005 || Catalina || CSS || — || align=right | 1.2 km || 
|-id=289 bgcolor=#E9E9E9
| 245289 ||  || — || February 1, 2005 || Catalina || CSS || — || align=right | 1.7 km || 
|-id=290 bgcolor=#E9E9E9
| 245290 ||  || — || February 1, 2005 || Kitt Peak || Spacewatch || HEN || align=right | 1.0 km || 
|-id=291 bgcolor=#E9E9E9
| 245291 ||  || — || February 2, 2005 || Socorro || LINEAR || — || align=right | 3.7 km || 
|-id=292 bgcolor=#fefefe
| 245292 ||  || — || February 2, 2005 || Kitt Peak || Spacewatch || EUT || align=right data-sort-value="0.83" | 830 m || 
|-id=293 bgcolor=#E9E9E9
| 245293 ||  || — || February 3, 2005 || Socorro || LINEAR || — || align=right | 2.6 km || 
|-id=294 bgcolor=#E9E9E9
| 245294 ||  || — || February 9, 2005 || Anderson Mesa || LONEOS || — || align=right | 2.1 km || 
|-id=295 bgcolor=#fefefe
| 245295 ||  || — || February 9, 2005 || Socorro || LINEAR || NYS || align=right | 1.1 km || 
|-id=296 bgcolor=#E9E9E9
| 245296 ||  || — || February 9, 2005 || Mount Lemmon || Mount Lemmon Survey || — || align=right | 1.6 km || 
|-id=297 bgcolor=#E9E9E9
| 245297 ||  || — || February 3, 2005 || Socorro || LINEAR || — || align=right | 3.5 km || 
|-id=298 bgcolor=#fefefe
| 245298 ||  || — || February 4, 2005 || Anderson Mesa || LONEOS || — || align=right | 1.3 km || 
|-id=299 bgcolor=#E9E9E9
| 245299 ||  || — || February 7, 2005 || Marly || P. Kocher || — || align=right | 1.9 km || 
|-id=300 bgcolor=#E9E9E9
| 245300 ||  || — || February 1, 2005 || Catalina || CSS || — || align=right | 1.4 km || 
|}

245301–245400 

|-bgcolor=#fefefe
| 245301 ||  || — || March 1, 2005 || Kitt Peak || Spacewatch || — || align=right | 1.7 km || 
|-id=302 bgcolor=#E9E9E9
| 245302 ||  || — || March 2, 2005 || Catalina || CSS || — || align=right | 1.4 km || 
|-id=303 bgcolor=#E9E9E9
| 245303 ||  || — || March 3, 2005 || Vail-Jarnac || Jarnac Obs. || — || align=right | 3.5 km || 
|-id=304 bgcolor=#E9E9E9
| 245304 ||  || — || March 3, 2005 || Catalina || CSS || NEM || align=right | 4.2 km || 
|-id=305 bgcolor=#E9E9E9
| 245305 ||  || — || March 3, 2005 || Socorro || LINEAR || — || align=right | 3.8 km || 
|-id=306 bgcolor=#fefefe
| 245306 ||  || — || March 3, 2005 || Catalina || CSS || NYS || align=right | 2.7 km || 
|-id=307 bgcolor=#E9E9E9
| 245307 ||  || — || March 3, 2005 || Catalina || CSS || NEM || align=right | 3.1 km || 
|-id=308 bgcolor=#E9E9E9
| 245308 ||  || — || March 3, 2005 || Kitt Peak || Spacewatch || — || align=right | 1.9 km || 
|-id=309 bgcolor=#E9E9E9
| 245309 ||  || — || March 4, 2005 || Catalina || CSS || PAE || align=right | 3.8 km || 
|-id=310 bgcolor=#E9E9E9
| 245310 ||  || — || March 4, 2005 || Catalina || CSS || — || align=right | 3.0 km || 
|-id=311 bgcolor=#E9E9E9
| 245311 ||  || — || March 4, 2005 || Socorro || LINEAR || — || align=right | 2.3 km || 
|-id=312 bgcolor=#d6d6d6
| 245312 ||  || — || March 7, 2005 || Junk Bond || Junk Bond Obs. || — || align=right | 2.8 km || 
|-id=313 bgcolor=#d6d6d6
| 245313 ||  || — || March 1, 2005 || Catalina || CSS || — || align=right | 5.4 km || 
|-id=314 bgcolor=#E9E9E9
| 245314 ||  || — || March 4, 2005 || Kitt Peak || Spacewatch || MAR || align=right | 1.5 km || 
|-id=315 bgcolor=#d6d6d6
| 245315 ||  || — || March 4, 2005 || Socorro || LINEAR || EOS || align=right | 2.4 km || 
|-id=316 bgcolor=#E9E9E9
| 245316 ||  || — || March 4, 2005 || Mount Lemmon || Mount Lemmon Survey || — || align=right | 2.6 km || 
|-id=317 bgcolor=#d6d6d6
| 245317 ||  || — || March 4, 2005 || Kitt Peak || Spacewatch || HYG || align=right | 4.2 km || 
|-id=318 bgcolor=#E9E9E9
| 245318 ||  || — || March 2, 2005 || Catalina || CSS || RAF || align=right | 1.4 km || 
|-id=319 bgcolor=#E9E9E9
| 245319 ||  || — || March 3, 2005 || Kitt Peak || Spacewatch || — || align=right | 3.1 km || 
|-id=320 bgcolor=#d6d6d6
| 245320 ||  || — || March 3, 2005 || Kitt Peak || Spacewatch || — || align=right | 4.3 km || 
|-id=321 bgcolor=#E9E9E9
| 245321 ||  || — || March 4, 2005 || Kitt Peak || Spacewatch || — || align=right | 2.3 km || 
|-id=322 bgcolor=#E9E9E9
| 245322 ||  || — || March 4, 2005 || Kitt Peak || Spacewatch || — || align=right | 1.6 km || 
|-id=323 bgcolor=#E9E9E9
| 245323 ||  || — || March 4, 2005 || Socorro || LINEAR || — || align=right | 2.1 km || 
|-id=324 bgcolor=#E9E9E9
| 245324 ||  || — || March 4, 2005 || Mount Lemmon || Mount Lemmon Survey || HOF || align=right | 3.6 km || 
|-id=325 bgcolor=#fefefe
| 245325 ||  || — || March 8, 2005 || Kitt Peak || Spacewatch || NYS || align=right | 2.3 km || 
|-id=326 bgcolor=#E9E9E9
| 245326 ||  || — || March 8, 2005 || Kitt Peak || Spacewatch || MAR || align=right | 1.4 km || 
|-id=327 bgcolor=#d6d6d6
| 245327 ||  || — || March 8, 2005 || Anderson Mesa || LONEOS || — || align=right | 2.6 km || 
|-id=328 bgcolor=#E9E9E9
| 245328 ||  || — || March 4, 2005 || Catalina || CSS || DOR || align=right | 4.4 km || 
|-id=329 bgcolor=#E9E9E9
| 245329 ||  || — || March 4, 2005 || Mount Lemmon || Mount Lemmon Survey || WIT || align=right | 1.1 km || 
|-id=330 bgcolor=#E9E9E9
| 245330 ||  || — || March 9, 2005 || Kitt Peak || Spacewatch || — || align=right | 3.0 km || 
|-id=331 bgcolor=#E9E9E9
| 245331 ||  || — || March 9, 2005 || Socorro || LINEAR || GAL || align=right | 2.9 km || 
|-id=332 bgcolor=#E9E9E9
| 245332 ||  || — || March 9, 2005 || Socorro || LINEAR || — || align=right | 2.4 km || 
|-id=333 bgcolor=#E9E9E9
| 245333 ||  || — || March 10, 2005 || Mount Lemmon || Mount Lemmon Survey || — || align=right | 2.0 km || 
|-id=334 bgcolor=#E9E9E9
| 245334 ||  || — || March 10, 2005 || Mount Lemmon || Mount Lemmon Survey || — || align=right | 3.3 km || 
|-id=335 bgcolor=#E9E9E9
| 245335 ||  || — || March 10, 2005 || Kitt Peak || Spacewatch || — || align=right | 3.3 km || 
|-id=336 bgcolor=#E9E9E9
| 245336 ||  || — || March 10, 2005 || Kitt Peak || Spacewatch || XIZ || align=right | 2.6 km || 
|-id=337 bgcolor=#E9E9E9
| 245337 ||  || — || March 7, 2005 || Socorro || LINEAR || — || align=right | 3.5 km || 
|-id=338 bgcolor=#E9E9E9
| 245338 ||  || — || March 11, 2005 || Kitt Peak || Spacewatch || WIT || align=right | 1.2 km || 
|-id=339 bgcolor=#d6d6d6
| 245339 ||  || — || March 9, 2005 || Catalina || CSS || EUP || align=right | 6.1 km || 
|-id=340 bgcolor=#d6d6d6
| 245340 ||  || — || March 8, 2005 || Catalina || CSS || EUP || align=right | 6.9 km || 
|-id=341 bgcolor=#E9E9E9
| 245341 ||  || — || March 8, 2005 || Kitt Peak || Spacewatch || — || align=right | 2.7 km || 
|-id=342 bgcolor=#fefefe
| 245342 ||  || — || March 9, 2005 || Kitt Peak || Spacewatch || V || align=right | 1.1 km || 
|-id=343 bgcolor=#E9E9E9
| 245343 ||  || — || March 9, 2005 || Socorro || LINEAR || — || align=right | 2.4 km || 
|-id=344 bgcolor=#E9E9E9
| 245344 ||  || — || March 9, 2005 || Kitt Peak || Spacewatch || ADE || align=right | 3.6 km || 
|-id=345 bgcolor=#E9E9E9
| 245345 ||  || — || March 11, 2005 || Mount Lemmon || Mount Lemmon Survey || — || align=right | 1.8 km || 
|-id=346 bgcolor=#E9E9E9
| 245346 ||  || — || March 10, 2005 || Mount Lemmon || Mount Lemmon Survey || HOF || align=right | 3.3 km || 
|-id=347 bgcolor=#E9E9E9
| 245347 ||  || — || March 4, 2005 || Socorro || LINEAR || — || align=right | 2.1 km || 
|-id=348 bgcolor=#d6d6d6
| 245348 ||  || — || March 8, 2005 || Anderson Mesa || LONEOS || EUP || align=right | 6.4 km || 
|-id=349 bgcolor=#d6d6d6
| 245349 ||  || — || March 10, 2005 || Mount Lemmon || Mount Lemmon Survey || HYG || align=right | 3.7 km || 
|-id=350 bgcolor=#d6d6d6
| 245350 ||  || — || March 10, 2005 || Mount Lemmon || Mount Lemmon Survey || — || align=right | 3.7 km || 
|-id=351 bgcolor=#E9E9E9
| 245351 ||  || — || March 11, 2005 || Catalina || CSS || — || align=right | 2.2 km || 
|-id=352 bgcolor=#E9E9E9
| 245352 ||  || — || March 12, 2005 || Socorro || LINEAR || — || align=right | 3.1 km || 
|-id=353 bgcolor=#E9E9E9
| 245353 ||  || — || March 9, 2005 || Socorro || LINEAR || — || align=right | 2.1 km || 
|-id=354 bgcolor=#E9E9E9
| 245354 ||  || — || March 11, 2005 || Mount Lemmon || Mount Lemmon Survey || WIT || align=right | 1.2 km || 
|-id=355 bgcolor=#E9E9E9
| 245355 ||  || — || March 13, 2005 || Kitt Peak || Spacewatch || — || align=right | 3.7 km || 
|-id=356 bgcolor=#E9E9E9
| 245356 ||  || — || March 13, 2005 || Catalina || CSS || NEM || align=right | 3.1 km || 
|-id=357 bgcolor=#d6d6d6
| 245357 ||  || — || March 13, 2005 || Anderson Mesa || LONEOS || TIR || align=right | 4.1 km || 
|-id=358 bgcolor=#E9E9E9
| 245358 ||  || — || March 11, 2005 || Junk Bond || Junk Bond Obs. || — || align=right | 1.3 km || 
|-id=359 bgcolor=#E9E9E9
| 245359 ||  || — || March 1, 2005 || Catalina || CSS || — || align=right | 3.0 km || 
|-id=360 bgcolor=#d6d6d6
| 245360 ||  || — || March 10, 2005 || Anderson Mesa || LONEOS || — || align=right | 5.6 km || 
|-id=361 bgcolor=#E9E9E9
| 245361 ||  || — || March 10, 2005 || Catalina || CSS || — || align=right | 3.3 km || 
|-id=362 bgcolor=#d6d6d6
| 245362 ||  || — || March 9, 2005 || Siding Spring || SSS || — || align=right | 3.1 km || 
|-id=363 bgcolor=#d6d6d6
| 245363 ||  || — || March 31, 2005 || Vail-Jarnac || Jarnac Obs. || EOS || align=right | 2.9 km || 
|-id=364 bgcolor=#E9E9E9
| 245364 ||  || — || March 30, 2005 || Catalina || CSS || — || align=right | 3.2 km || 
|-id=365 bgcolor=#E9E9E9
| 245365 ||  || — || March 19, 2005 || Siding Spring || SSS || EUN || align=right | 1.7 km || 
|-id=366 bgcolor=#E9E9E9
| 245366 || 2005 GS || — || April 1, 2005 || Kleť || Kleť Obs. || — || align=right | 4.0 km || 
|-id=367 bgcolor=#d6d6d6
| 245367 ||  || — || April 1, 2005 || Kitt Peak || Spacewatch || — || align=right | 3.5 km || 
|-id=368 bgcolor=#E9E9E9
| 245368 ||  || — || April 2, 2005 || Mount Lemmon || Mount Lemmon Survey || HEN || align=right data-sort-value="0.98" | 980 m || 
|-id=369 bgcolor=#d6d6d6
| 245369 ||  || — || April 4, 2005 || Socorro || LINEAR || — || align=right | 3.8 km || 
|-id=370 bgcolor=#E9E9E9
| 245370 ||  || — || April 4, 2005 || Mount Lemmon || Mount Lemmon Survey || — || align=right | 1.7 km || 
|-id=371 bgcolor=#E9E9E9
| 245371 ||  || — || April 6, 2005 || Anderson Mesa || LONEOS || JUN || align=right | 4.9 km || 
|-id=372 bgcolor=#E9E9E9
| 245372 ||  || — || April 2, 2005 || Catalina || CSS || — || align=right | 1.6 km || 
|-id=373 bgcolor=#E9E9E9
| 245373 ||  || — || April 4, 2005 || Catalina || CSS || — || align=right | 3.6 km || 
|-id=374 bgcolor=#E9E9E9
| 245374 ||  || — || April 4, 2005 || Catalina || CSS || MAR || align=right | 1.4 km || 
|-id=375 bgcolor=#d6d6d6
| 245375 ||  || — || April 6, 2005 || Catalina || CSS || — || align=right | 3.0 km || 
|-id=376 bgcolor=#E9E9E9
| 245376 ||  || — || April 6, 2005 || Catalina || CSS || — || align=right | 2.7 km || 
|-id=377 bgcolor=#d6d6d6
| 245377 ||  || — || April 4, 2005 || Mount Lemmon || Mount Lemmon Survey || — || align=right | 3.9 km || 
|-id=378 bgcolor=#d6d6d6
| 245378 ||  || — || April 6, 2005 || Kitt Peak || Spacewatch || — || align=right | 4.2 km || 
|-id=379 bgcolor=#E9E9E9
| 245379 ||  || — || April 6, 2005 || Catalina || CSS || INO || align=right | 1.8 km || 
|-id=380 bgcolor=#d6d6d6
| 245380 ||  || — || April 7, 2005 || Mount Lemmon || Mount Lemmon Survey || CRO || align=right | 4.9 km || 
|-id=381 bgcolor=#d6d6d6
| 245381 ||  || — || April 10, 2005 || Kitt Peak || Spacewatch || — || align=right | 2.9 km || 
|-id=382 bgcolor=#d6d6d6
| 245382 ||  || — || April 10, 2005 || Mount Lemmon || Mount Lemmon Survey || — || align=right | 5.1 km || 
|-id=383 bgcolor=#d6d6d6
| 245383 ||  || — || April 10, 2005 || Mount Lemmon || Mount Lemmon Survey || — || align=right | 6.2 km || 
|-id=384 bgcolor=#E9E9E9
| 245384 ||  || — || April 10, 2005 || Kitt Peak || Spacewatch || — || align=right | 2.3 km || 
|-id=385 bgcolor=#d6d6d6
| 245385 ||  || — || April 6, 2005 || Anderson Mesa || LONEOS || — || align=right | 3.2 km || 
|-id=386 bgcolor=#d6d6d6
| 245386 ||  || — || April 11, 2005 || Kitt Peak || Spacewatch || — || align=right | 2.9 km || 
|-id=387 bgcolor=#d6d6d6
| 245387 ||  || — || April 12, 2005 || Anderson Mesa || LONEOS || — || align=right | 3.0 km || 
|-id=388 bgcolor=#d6d6d6
| 245388 ||  || — || April 7, 2005 || Anderson Mesa || LONEOS || — || align=right | 4.0 km || 
|-id=389 bgcolor=#E9E9E9
| 245389 ||  || — || April 8, 2005 || Socorro || LINEAR || — || align=right | 1.9 km || 
|-id=390 bgcolor=#d6d6d6
| 245390 ||  || — || April 10, 2005 || Kitt Peak || Spacewatch || SAN || align=right | 1.4 km || 
|-id=391 bgcolor=#E9E9E9
| 245391 ||  || — || April 10, 2005 || Mount Lemmon || Mount Lemmon Survey || GEF || align=right | 1.8 km || 
|-id=392 bgcolor=#E9E9E9
| 245392 ||  || — || April 14, 2005 || Kitt Peak || Spacewatch || — || align=right | 2.2 km || 
|-id=393 bgcolor=#E9E9E9
| 245393 ||  || — || April 15, 2005 || Catalina || CSS || — || align=right | 2.1 km || 
|-id=394 bgcolor=#E9E9E9
| 245394 ||  || — || April 10, 2005 || Mount Lemmon || Mount Lemmon Survey || — || align=right | 2.0 km || 
|-id=395 bgcolor=#E9E9E9
| 245395 ||  || — || April 11, 2005 || Mount Lemmon || Mount Lemmon Survey || — || align=right | 2.6 km || 
|-id=396 bgcolor=#d6d6d6
| 245396 ||  || — || April 12, 2005 || Mount Lemmon || Mount Lemmon Survey || — || align=right | 3.3 km || 
|-id=397 bgcolor=#E9E9E9
| 245397 ||  || — || April 14, 2005 || Kitt Peak || Spacewatch || AGN || align=right | 1.4 km || 
|-id=398 bgcolor=#E9E9E9
| 245398 ||  || — || April 14, 2005 || Kitt Peak || Spacewatch || DOR || align=right | 2.8 km || 
|-id=399 bgcolor=#E9E9E9
| 245399 ||  || — || April 15, 2005 || Kitt Peak || Spacewatch || — || align=right | 2.9 km || 
|-id=400 bgcolor=#E9E9E9
| 245400 ||  || — || April 1, 2005 || Kitt Peak || Spacewatch || — || align=right | 2.8 km || 
|}

245401–245500 

|-bgcolor=#d6d6d6
| 245401 ||  || — || April 10, 2005 || Kitt Peak || M. W. Buie || EOS || align=right | 2.2 km || 
|-id=402 bgcolor=#E9E9E9
| 245402 ||  || — || April 10, 2005 || Kitt Peak || M. W. Buie || — || align=right | 1.5 km || 
|-id=403 bgcolor=#E9E9E9
| 245403 ||  || — || April 11, 2005 || Kitt Peak || Spacewatch || PAD || align=right | 3.4 km || 
|-id=404 bgcolor=#E9E9E9
| 245404 ||  || — || April 2, 2005 || Catalina || CSS || — || align=right | 2.6 km || 
|-id=405 bgcolor=#E9E9E9
| 245405 ||  || — || April 7, 2005 || Kitt Peak || Spacewatch || HOF || align=right | 3.4 km || 
|-id=406 bgcolor=#d6d6d6
| 245406 ||  || — || April 30, 2005 || Kitt Peak || Spacewatch || — || align=right | 4.8 km || 
|-id=407 bgcolor=#d6d6d6
| 245407 ||  || — || April 16, 2005 || Kitt Peak || Spacewatch || — || align=right | 4.5 km || 
|-id=408 bgcolor=#d6d6d6
| 245408 ||  || — || May 3, 2005 || Kitt Peak || Spacewatch || — || align=right | 3.4 km || 
|-id=409 bgcolor=#fefefe
| 245409 ||  || — || May 2, 2005 || Kitt Peak || Spacewatch || H || align=right data-sort-value="0.80" | 800 m || 
|-id=410 bgcolor=#d6d6d6
| 245410 ||  || — || May 4, 2005 || Mauna Kea || C. Veillet || — || align=right | 3.6 km || 
|-id=411 bgcolor=#d6d6d6
| 245411 ||  || — || May 3, 2005 || Kitt Peak || Spacewatch || KOR || align=right | 1.9 km || 
|-id=412 bgcolor=#E9E9E9
| 245412 ||  || — || May 4, 2005 || Mount Lemmon || Mount Lemmon Survey || DOR || align=right | 2.7 km || 
|-id=413 bgcolor=#fefefe
| 245413 ||  || — || May 4, 2005 || Cordell-Lorenz || D. T. Durig || — || align=right | 2.3 km || 
|-id=414 bgcolor=#E9E9E9
| 245414 ||  || — || May 3, 2005 || Kitt Peak || Spacewatch || — || align=right | 1.5 km || 
|-id=415 bgcolor=#E9E9E9
| 245415 ||  || — || May 4, 2005 || Kitt Peak || Spacewatch || — || align=right | 1.6 km || 
|-id=416 bgcolor=#E9E9E9
| 245416 ||  || — || May 7, 2005 || Kitt Peak || Spacewatch || — || align=right | 2.6 km || 
|-id=417 bgcolor=#E9E9E9
| 245417 Rostand ||  ||  || May 9, 2005 || Saint-Sulpice || B. Christophe || — || align=right | 1.5 km || 
|-id=418 bgcolor=#d6d6d6
| 245418 ||  || — || May 3, 2005 || Kitt Peak || Spacewatch || — || align=right | 4.9 km || 
|-id=419 bgcolor=#d6d6d6
| 245419 ||  || — || May 3, 2005 || Kitt Peak || Spacewatch || — || align=right | 4.9 km || 
|-id=420 bgcolor=#d6d6d6
| 245420 ||  || — || May 4, 2005 || Kitt Peak || Spacewatch || — || align=right | 4.2 km || 
|-id=421 bgcolor=#fefefe
| 245421 ||  || — || May 4, 2005 || Kitt Peak || DLS || H || align=right data-sort-value="0.62" | 620 m || 
|-id=422 bgcolor=#d6d6d6
| 245422 ||  || — || May 4, 2005 || Palomar || NEAT || — || align=right | 3.6 km || 
|-id=423 bgcolor=#d6d6d6
| 245423 ||  || — || May 8, 2005 || Kitt Peak || Spacewatch || KOR || align=right | 1.6 km || 
|-id=424 bgcolor=#E9E9E9
| 245424 ||  || — || May 8, 2005 || Anderson Mesa || LONEOS || MAR || align=right | 2.3 km || 
|-id=425 bgcolor=#E9E9E9
| 245425 ||  || — || May 9, 2005 || Mount Lemmon || Mount Lemmon Survey || INO || align=right | 1.5 km || 
|-id=426 bgcolor=#d6d6d6
| 245426 ||  || — || May 8, 2005 || Kitt Peak || Spacewatch || — || align=right | 3.2 km || 
|-id=427 bgcolor=#d6d6d6
| 245427 ||  || — || May 11, 2005 || Mount Lemmon || Mount Lemmon Survey || — || align=right | 4.3 km || 
|-id=428 bgcolor=#d6d6d6
| 245428 ||  || — || May 11, 2005 || Mount Lemmon || Mount Lemmon Survey || — || align=right | 5.7 km || 
|-id=429 bgcolor=#d6d6d6
| 245429 ||  || — || May 12, 2005 || Mount Lemmon || Mount Lemmon Survey || — || align=right | 4.7 km || 
|-id=430 bgcolor=#d6d6d6
| 245430 ||  || — || May 10, 2005 || Bergisch Gladbac || Bergisch Gladbach Obs. || EOS || align=right | 2.0 km || 
|-id=431 bgcolor=#d6d6d6
| 245431 ||  || — || May 6, 2005 || Kitt Peak || DLS || EUP || align=right | 3.9 km || 
|-id=432 bgcolor=#d6d6d6
| 245432 ||  || — || May 10, 2005 || Kitt Peak || Spacewatch || — || align=right | 3.2 km || 
|-id=433 bgcolor=#d6d6d6
| 245433 ||  || — || May 10, 2005 || Kitt Peak || Spacewatch || — || align=right | 3.5 km || 
|-id=434 bgcolor=#d6d6d6
| 245434 ||  || — || May 10, 2005 || Kitt Peak || Spacewatch || HYG || align=right | 4.3 km || 
|-id=435 bgcolor=#E9E9E9
| 245435 ||  || — || May 10, 2005 || Kitt Peak || Spacewatch || — || align=right | 3.0 km || 
|-id=436 bgcolor=#d6d6d6
| 245436 ||  || — || May 14, 2005 || Kitt Peak || Spacewatch || EOS || align=right | 3.8 km || 
|-id=437 bgcolor=#E9E9E9
| 245437 ||  || — || May 15, 2005 || Palomar || NEAT || — || align=right | 1.9 km || 
|-id=438 bgcolor=#d6d6d6
| 245438 ||  || — || May 14, 2005 || Socorro || LINEAR || ALA || align=right | 5.9 km || 
|-id=439 bgcolor=#E9E9E9
| 245439 ||  || — || May 15, 2005 || Palomar || NEAT || — || align=right | 2.4 km || 
|-id=440 bgcolor=#d6d6d6
| 245440 ||  || — || May 4, 2005 || Mount Lemmon || Mount Lemmon Survey || EOS || align=right | 2.5 km || 
|-id=441 bgcolor=#d6d6d6
| 245441 ||  || — || May 8, 2005 || Mount Lemmon || Mount Lemmon Survey || KOR || align=right | 1.7 km || 
|-id=442 bgcolor=#d6d6d6
| 245442 ||  || — || May 11, 2005 || Catalina || CSS || — || align=right | 3.4 km || 
|-id=443 bgcolor=#d6d6d6
| 245443 ||  || — || May 11, 2005 || Cerro Tololo || M. W. Buie || K-2 || align=right | 1.6 km || 
|-id=444 bgcolor=#d6d6d6
| 245444 ||  || — || May 8, 2005 || Kitt Peak || Spacewatch || — || align=right | 3.0 km || 
|-id=445 bgcolor=#E9E9E9
| 245445 ||  || — || May 16, 2005 || Kitt Peak || Spacewatch || — || align=right | 2.3 km || 
|-id=446 bgcolor=#d6d6d6
| 245446 ||  || — || May 18, 2005 || Palomar || NEAT || SAN || align=right | 2.0 km || 
|-id=447 bgcolor=#d6d6d6
| 245447 ||  || — || May 19, 2005 || Mount Lemmon || Mount Lemmon Survey || EMA || align=right | 4.7 km || 
|-id=448 bgcolor=#d6d6d6
| 245448 ||  || — || May 21, 2005 || Mount Lemmon || Mount Lemmon Survey || LIX || align=right | 6.0 km || 
|-id=449 bgcolor=#d6d6d6
| 245449 ||  || — || May 21, 2005 || Palomar || NEAT || VER || align=right | 3.9 km || 
|-id=450 bgcolor=#E9E9E9
| 245450 ||  || — || June 1, 2005 || Anderson Mesa || LONEOS || GAL || align=right | 2.1 km || 
|-id=451 bgcolor=#d6d6d6
| 245451 || 2005 LV || — || June 1, 2005 || Bergisch Gladbach || W. Bickel || — || align=right | 3.5 km || 
|-id=452 bgcolor=#d6d6d6
| 245452 ||  || — || June 1, 2005 || Socorro || LINEAR || EUP || align=right | 4.4 km || 
|-id=453 bgcolor=#d6d6d6
| 245453 ||  || — || June 3, 2005 || Kitt Peak || Spacewatch || — || align=right | 3.0 km || 
|-id=454 bgcolor=#d6d6d6
| 245454 ||  || — || June 3, 2005 || Kitt Peak || Spacewatch || HYG || align=right | 4.1 km || 
|-id=455 bgcolor=#d6d6d6
| 245455 ||  || — || June 8, 2005 || Kitt Peak || Spacewatch || — || align=right | 3.0 km || 
|-id=456 bgcolor=#d6d6d6
| 245456 ||  || — || June 6, 2005 || Kitt Peak || Spacewatch || — || align=right | 4.8 km || 
|-id=457 bgcolor=#d6d6d6
| 245457 ||  || — || June 11, 2005 || Kitt Peak || Spacewatch || — || align=right | 3.6 km || 
|-id=458 bgcolor=#E9E9E9
| 245458 ||  || — || June 10, 2005 || Kitt Peak || Spacewatch || — || align=right | 3.5 km || 
|-id=459 bgcolor=#d6d6d6
| 245459 ||  || — || June 10, 2005 || Kitt Peak || Spacewatch || — || align=right | 4.5 km || 
|-id=460 bgcolor=#d6d6d6
| 245460 ||  || — || June 13, 2005 || Kitt Peak || Spacewatch || — || align=right | 2.5 km || 
|-id=461 bgcolor=#d6d6d6
| 245461 ||  || — || June 16, 2005 || Kitt Peak || Spacewatch || — || align=right | 2.9 km || 
|-id=462 bgcolor=#E9E9E9
| 245462 ||  || — || June 28, 2005 || Palomar || NEAT || — || align=right | 1.8 km || 
|-id=463 bgcolor=#d6d6d6
| 245463 ||  || — || June 28, 2005 || Palomar || NEAT || — || align=right | 3.3 km || 
|-id=464 bgcolor=#d6d6d6
| 245464 ||  || — || June 29, 2005 || Kitt Peak || Spacewatch || — || align=right | 3.3 km || 
|-id=465 bgcolor=#d6d6d6
| 245465 ||  || — || June 27, 2005 || Kitt Peak || Spacewatch || — || align=right | 3.0 km || 
|-id=466 bgcolor=#d6d6d6
| 245466 ||  || — || June 29, 2005 || Kitt Peak || Spacewatch || — || align=right | 4.5 km || 
|-id=467 bgcolor=#d6d6d6
| 245467 ||  || — || June 30, 2005 || Palomar || NEAT || — || align=right | 4.3 km || 
|-id=468 bgcolor=#FA8072
| 245468 ||  || — || July 1, 2005 || Palomar || NEAT || H || align=right | 1.3 km || 
|-id=469 bgcolor=#d6d6d6
| 245469 ||  || — || July 3, 2005 || Mount Lemmon || Mount Lemmon Survey || — || align=right | 3.6 km || 
|-id=470 bgcolor=#E9E9E9
| 245470 ||  || — || July 5, 2005 || Mount Lemmon || Mount Lemmon Survey || — || align=right | 2.1 km || 
|-id=471 bgcolor=#d6d6d6
| 245471 ||  || — || July 5, 2005 || Mount Lemmon || Mount Lemmon Survey || 628 || align=right | 2.2 km || 
|-id=472 bgcolor=#d6d6d6
| 245472 ||  || — || July 4, 2005 || Mount Lemmon || Mount Lemmon Survey || — || align=right | 3.2 km || 
|-id=473 bgcolor=#fefefe
| 245473 ||  || — || July 5, 2005 || Mount Lemmon || Mount Lemmon Survey || H || align=right data-sort-value="0.89" | 890 m || 
|-id=474 bgcolor=#d6d6d6
| 245474 ||  || — || July 9, 2005 || Kitt Peak || Spacewatch || SYL7:4 || align=right | 6.3 km || 
|-id=475 bgcolor=#d6d6d6
| 245475 ||  || — || July 1, 2005 || Kitt Peak || Spacewatch || FIR || align=right | 4.4 km || 
|-id=476 bgcolor=#d6d6d6
| 245476 ||  || — || July 1, 2005 || Kitt Peak || Spacewatch || — || align=right | 6.6 km || 
|-id=477 bgcolor=#d6d6d6
| 245477 ||  || — || July 2, 2005 || Kitt Peak || Spacewatch || — || align=right | 2.7 km || 
|-id=478 bgcolor=#d6d6d6
| 245478 ||  || — || July 2, 2005 || Kitt Peak || Spacewatch || — || align=right | 2.7 km || 
|-id=479 bgcolor=#d6d6d6
| 245479 ||  || — || July 6, 2005 || Kitt Peak || Spacewatch || ELF || align=right | 4.4 km || 
|-id=480 bgcolor=#d6d6d6
| 245480 ||  || — || July 7, 2005 || Kitt Peak || Spacewatch || — || align=right | 3.5 km || 
|-id=481 bgcolor=#fefefe
| 245481 ||  || — || July 5, 2005 || Siding Spring || SSS || — || align=right | 2.2 km || 
|-id=482 bgcolor=#d6d6d6
| 245482 ||  || — || July 28, 2005 || Reedy Creek || J. Broughton || — || align=right | 4.8 km || 
|-id=483 bgcolor=#d6d6d6
| 245483 ||  || — || July 31, 2005 || Socorro || LINEAR || EUP || align=right | 5.7 km || 
|-id=484 bgcolor=#d6d6d6
| 245484 ||  || — || July 30, 2005 || Palomar || NEAT || EOS || align=right | 2.9 km || 
|-id=485 bgcolor=#E9E9E9
| 245485 ||  || — || August 4, 2005 || Palomar || NEAT || — || align=right | 3.6 km || 
|-id=486 bgcolor=#fefefe
| 245486 ||  || — || August 13, 2005 || Wrightwood || J. W. Young || — || align=right | 1.6 km || 
|-id=487 bgcolor=#d6d6d6
| 245487 ||  || — || August 11, 2005 || Reedy Creek || J. Broughton || — || align=right | 5.3 km || 
|-id=488 bgcolor=#d6d6d6
| 245488 ||  || — || August 25, 2005 || Palomar || NEAT || VER || align=right | 4.8 km || 
|-id=489 bgcolor=#fefefe
| 245489 ||  || — || August 25, 2005 || Palomar || NEAT || NYS || align=right | 1.9 km || 
|-id=490 bgcolor=#d6d6d6
| 245490 ||  || — || August 23, 2005 || Costitx || OAM Obs. || DUR || align=right | 5.9 km || 
|-id=491 bgcolor=#d6d6d6
| 245491 ||  || — || August 25, 2005 || Campo Imperatore || CINEOS || — || align=right | 3.7 km || 
|-id=492 bgcolor=#d6d6d6
| 245492 ||  || — || August 26, 2005 || Palomar || NEAT || — || align=right | 3.8 km || 
|-id=493 bgcolor=#d6d6d6
| 245493 ||  || — || August 27, 2005 || Anderson Mesa || LONEOS || — || align=right | 3.9 km || 
|-id=494 bgcolor=#d6d6d6
| 245494 ||  || — || August 29, 2005 || Gnosca || S. Sposetti || VER || align=right | 7.0 km || 
|-id=495 bgcolor=#d6d6d6
| 245495 ||  || — || August 30, 2005 || Vail-Jarnac || Jarnac Obs. || — || align=right | 3.5 km || 
|-id=496 bgcolor=#d6d6d6
| 245496 ||  || — || August 30, 2005 || Socorro || LINEAR || — || align=right | 3.4 km || 
|-id=497 bgcolor=#d6d6d6
| 245497 ||  || — || August 27, 2005 || Palomar || NEAT || — || align=right | 3.2 km || 
|-id=498 bgcolor=#d6d6d6
| 245498 ||  || — || August 26, 2005 || Palomar || NEAT || — || align=right | 4.2 km || 
|-id=499 bgcolor=#d6d6d6
| 245499 ||  || — || August 30, 2005 || Palomar || NEAT || — || align=right | 5.1 km || 
|-id=500 bgcolor=#d6d6d6
| 245500 ||  || — || August 30, 2005 || Palomar || NEAT || URS || align=right | 6.6 km || 
|}

245501–245600 

|-bgcolor=#d6d6d6
| 245501 ||  || — || August 30, 2005 || Palomar || NEAT || — || align=right | 3.1 km || 
|-id=502 bgcolor=#fefefe
| 245502 ||  || — || August 29, 2005 || Palomar || NEAT || H || align=right | 1.1 km || 
|-id=503 bgcolor=#d6d6d6
| 245503 ||  || — || August 27, 2005 || Palomar || NEAT || — || align=right | 4.1 km || 
|-id=504 bgcolor=#d6d6d6
| 245504 ||  || — || August 29, 2005 || Palomar || NEAT || — || align=right | 3.7 km || 
|-id=505 bgcolor=#d6d6d6
| 245505 ||  || — || August 31, 2005 || Anderson Mesa || LONEOS || — || align=right | 4.9 km || 
|-id=506 bgcolor=#d6d6d6
| 245506 || 2005 RV || — || September 2, 2005 || Consell Obs. || Consell Obs. || URS || align=right | 5.2 km || 
|-id=507 bgcolor=#d6d6d6
| 245507 ||  || — || September 11, 2005 || Anderson Mesa || LONEOS || — || align=right | 2.3 km || 
|-id=508 bgcolor=#d6d6d6
| 245508 ||  || — || September 11, 2005 || Anderson Mesa || LONEOS || — || align=right | 3.6 km || 
|-id=509 bgcolor=#d6d6d6
| 245509 ||  || — || September 13, 2005 || Socorro || LINEAR || — || align=right | 6.0 km || 
|-id=510 bgcolor=#E9E9E9
| 245510 ||  || — || September 23, 2005 || Kitt Peak || Spacewatch || — || align=right | 3.0 km || 
|-id=511 bgcolor=#d6d6d6
| 245511 ||  || — || September 24, 2005 || Kitt Peak || Spacewatch || — || align=right | 5.3 km || 
|-id=512 bgcolor=#d6d6d6
| 245512 ||  || — || September 25, 2005 || Kitt Peak || Spacewatch || THM || align=right | 3.2 km || 
|-id=513 bgcolor=#d6d6d6
| 245513 ||  || — || September 26, 2005 || Palomar || NEAT || — || align=right | 6.8 km || 
|-id=514 bgcolor=#fefefe
| 245514 ||  || — || September 26, 2005 || Kitt Peak || Spacewatch || NYS || align=right | 2.6 km || 
|-id=515 bgcolor=#d6d6d6
| 245515 ||  || — || September 23, 2005 || Catalina || CSS || — || align=right | 2.6 km || 
|-id=516 bgcolor=#d6d6d6
| 245516 ||  || — || September 23, 2005 || Catalina || CSS || NAE || align=right | 5.1 km || 
|-id=517 bgcolor=#d6d6d6
| 245517 ||  || — || September 24, 2005 || Kitt Peak || Spacewatch || EOS || align=right | 2.8 km || 
|-id=518 bgcolor=#fefefe
| 245518 ||  || — || September 25, 2005 || Palomar || NEAT || — || align=right data-sort-value="0.93" | 930 m || 
|-id=519 bgcolor=#d6d6d6
| 245519 ||  || — || September 25, 2005 || Kitt Peak || Spacewatch || — || align=right | 2.5 km || 
|-id=520 bgcolor=#d6d6d6
| 245520 ||  || — || September 26, 2005 || Catalina || CSS || JLI || align=right | 5.5 km || 
|-id=521 bgcolor=#d6d6d6
| 245521 ||  || — || September 26, 2005 || Črni Vrh || Črni Vrh || URS || align=right | 6.0 km || 
|-id=522 bgcolor=#d6d6d6
| 245522 ||  || — || September 29, 2005 || Kitt Peak || Spacewatch || — || align=right | 3.8 km || 
|-id=523 bgcolor=#d6d6d6
| 245523 ||  || — || September 25, 2005 || Kitt Peak || Spacewatch || THM || align=right | 2.7 km || 
|-id=524 bgcolor=#d6d6d6
| 245524 ||  || — || September 25, 2005 || Kitt Peak || Spacewatch || NAE || align=right | 4.8 km || 
|-id=525 bgcolor=#d6d6d6
| 245525 ||  || — || September 28, 2005 || Palomar || NEAT || — || align=right | 3.2 km || 
|-id=526 bgcolor=#d6d6d6
| 245526 ||  || — || September 28, 2005 || Palomar || NEAT || — || align=right | 3.7 km || 
|-id=527 bgcolor=#fefefe
| 245527 ||  || — || September 29, 2005 || Kitt Peak || Spacewatch || — || align=right data-sort-value="0.83" | 830 m || 
|-id=528 bgcolor=#fefefe
| 245528 ||  || — || September 29, 2005 || Catalina || CSS || H || align=right data-sort-value="0.85" | 850 m || 
|-id=529 bgcolor=#d6d6d6
| 245529 ||  || — || September 30, 2005 || Palomar || NEAT || — || align=right | 4.4 km || 
|-id=530 bgcolor=#d6d6d6
| 245530 ||  || — || September 30, 2005 || Palomar || NEAT || SYL7:4 || align=right | 7.7 km || 
|-id=531 bgcolor=#d6d6d6
| 245531 ||  || — || September 30, 2005 || Kitt Peak || Spacewatch || THB || align=right | 6.4 km || 
|-id=532 bgcolor=#d6d6d6
| 245532 ||  || — || September 30, 2005 || Catalina || CSS || — || align=right | 5.8 km || 
|-id=533 bgcolor=#d6d6d6
| 245533 ||  || — || September 27, 2005 || Socorro || LINEAR || — || align=right | 5.2 km || 
|-id=534 bgcolor=#d6d6d6
| 245534 ||  || — || September 30, 2005 || Anderson Mesa || LONEOS || — || align=right | 4.8 km || 
|-id=535 bgcolor=#d6d6d6
| 245535 ||  || — || September 25, 2005 || Kitt Peak || Spacewatch || — || align=right | 3.6 km || 
|-id=536 bgcolor=#d6d6d6
| 245536 ||  || — || September 25, 2005 || Apache Point || A. C. Becker || — || align=right | 5.2 km || 
|-id=537 bgcolor=#d6d6d6
| 245537 ||  || — || October 1, 2005 || Mount Lemmon || Mount Lemmon Survey || — || align=right | 2.5 km || 
|-id=538 bgcolor=#fefefe
| 245538 ||  || — || October 2, 2005 || Siding Spring || SSS || H || align=right data-sort-value="0.99" | 990 m || 
|-id=539 bgcolor=#d6d6d6
| 245539 ||  || — || October 12, 2005 || Calvin-Rehoboth || L. A. Molnar || THM || align=right | 2.5 km || 
|-id=540 bgcolor=#fefefe
| 245540 ||  || — || October 4, 2005 || Palomar || NEAT || — || align=right | 1.5 km || 
|-id=541 bgcolor=#fefefe
| 245541 ||  || — || October 3, 2005 || Socorro || LINEAR || — || align=right | 1.6 km || 
|-id=542 bgcolor=#fefefe
| 245542 ||  || — || October 5, 2005 || Socorro || LINEAR || NYS || align=right data-sort-value="0.88" | 880 m || 
|-id=543 bgcolor=#d6d6d6
| 245543 ||  || — || October 8, 2005 || Socorro || LINEAR || — || align=right | 5.8 km || 
|-id=544 bgcolor=#d6d6d6
| 245544 ||  || — || October 9, 2005 || Kitt Peak || Spacewatch || — || align=right | 4.7 km || 
|-id=545 bgcolor=#d6d6d6
| 245545 ||  || — || October 10, 2005 || Kitt Peak || Spacewatch || — || align=right | 3.3 km || 
|-id=546 bgcolor=#d6d6d6
| 245546 ||  || — || October 12, 2005 || Anderson Mesa || LONEOS || — || align=right | 5.9 km || 
|-id=547 bgcolor=#fefefe
| 245547 ||  || — || October 12, 2005 || Socorro || LINEAR || — || align=right | 1.1 km || 
|-id=548 bgcolor=#fefefe
| 245548 ||  || — || October 7, 2005 || Mauna Kea || Mauna Kea Obs. || V || align=right data-sort-value="0.82" | 820 m || 
|-id=549 bgcolor=#fefefe
| 245549 ||  || — || October 7, 2005 || Mauna Kea || Mauna Kea Obs. || — || align=right data-sort-value="0.99" | 990 m || 
|-id=550 bgcolor=#d6d6d6
| 245550 ||  || — || October 25, 2005 || Socorro || LINEAR || EUP || align=right | 5.3 km || 
|-id=551 bgcolor=#d6d6d6
| 245551 ||  || — || October 27, 2005 || Socorro || LINEAR || — || align=right | 5.0 km || 
|-id=552 bgcolor=#fefefe
| 245552 ||  || — || October 27, 2005 || Ottmarsheim || C. Rinner || FLO || align=right | 1.1 km || 
|-id=553 bgcolor=#d6d6d6
| 245553 ||  || — || October 21, 2005 || Palomar || NEAT || — || align=right | 4.9 km || 
|-id=554 bgcolor=#d6d6d6
| 245554 ||  || — || October 22, 2005 || Kitt Peak || Spacewatch || EUP || align=right | 5.8 km || 
|-id=555 bgcolor=#fefefe
| 245555 ||  || — || October 23, 2005 || Catalina || CSS || — || align=right | 1.1 km || 
|-id=556 bgcolor=#d6d6d6
| 245556 ||  || — || October 24, 2005 || Anderson Mesa || LONEOS || — || align=right | 5.1 km || 
|-id=557 bgcolor=#d6d6d6
| 245557 ||  || — || October 24, 2005 || Kitt Peak || Spacewatch || EOS || align=right | 3.7 km || 
|-id=558 bgcolor=#d6d6d6
| 245558 ||  || — || October 23, 2005 || Palomar || NEAT || — || align=right | 3.0 km || 
|-id=559 bgcolor=#d6d6d6
| 245559 ||  || — || October 24, 2005 || Palomar || NEAT || — || align=right | 4.9 km || 
|-id=560 bgcolor=#fefefe
| 245560 ||  || — || October 25, 2005 || Catalina || CSS || FLO || align=right data-sort-value="0.98" | 980 m || 
|-id=561 bgcolor=#d6d6d6
| 245561 ||  || — || October 21, 2005 || Palomar || NEAT || — || align=right | 4.4 km || 
|-id=562 bgcolor=#d6d6d6
| 245562 ||  || — || October 22, 2005 || Palomar || NEAT || — || align=right | 3.6 km || 
|-id=563 bgcolor=#d6d6d6
| 245563 ||  || — || October 22, 2005 || Palomar || NEAT || — || align=right | 3.2 km || 
|-id=564 bgcolor=#fefefe
| 245564 ||  || — || October 22, 2005 || Kitt Peak || Spacewatch || — || align=right data-sort-value="0.72" | 720 m || 
|-id=565 bgcolor=#d6d6d6
| 245565 ||  || — || October 23, 2005 || Catalina || CSS || — || align=right | 4.1 km || 
|-id=566 bgcolor=#d6d6d6
| 245566 ||  || — || October 24, 2005 || Kitt Peak || Spacewatch || — || align=right | 3.5 km || 
|-id=567 bgcolor=#d6d6d6
| 245567 ||  || — || October 24, 2005 || Kitt Peak || Spacewatch || — || align=right | 3.2 km || 
|-id=568 bgcolor=#fefefe
| 245568 ||  || — || October 26, 2005 || Goodricke-Pigott || R. A. Tucker || FLO || align=right data-sort-value="0.92" | 920 m || 
|-id=569 bgcolor=#d6d6d6
| 245569 ||  || — || October 26, 2005 || Kitt Peak || Spacewatch || THM || align=right | 2.8 km || 
|-id=570 bgcolor=#d6d6d6
| 245570 ||  || — || October 26, 2005 || Palomar || NEAT || — || align=right | 2.5 km || 
|-id=571 bgcolor=#fefefe
| 245571 ||  || — || October 22, 2005 || Catalina || CSS || FLO || align=right data-sort-value="0.84" | 840 m || 
|-id=572 bgcolor=#d6d6d6
| 245572 ||  || — || October 24, 2005 || Kitt Peak || Spacewatch || — || align=right | 3.4 km || 
|-id=573 bgcolor=#d6d6d6
| 245573 ||  || — || October 25, 2005 || Kitt Peak || Spacewatch || — || align=right | 4.3 km || 
|-id=574 bgcolor=#d6d6d6
| 245574 ||  || — || October 26, 2005 || Anderson Mesa || LONEOS || — || align=right | 6.1 km || 
|-id=575 bgcolor=#fefefe
| 245575 ||  || — || October 28, 2005 || Kitt Peak || Spacewatch || — || align=right | 1.1 km || 
|-id=576 bgcolor=#d6d6d6
| 245576 ||  || — || October 25, 2005 || Catalina || CSS || EOS || align=right | 2.9 km || 
|-id=577 bgcolor=#d6d6d6
| 245577 ||  || — || October 26, 2005 || Kitt Peak || Spacewatch || — || align=right | 4.3 km || 
|-id=578 bgcolor=#d6d6d6
| 245578 ||  || — || October 30, 2005 || Mount Lemmon || Mount Lemmon Survey || 3:2 || align=right | 6.1 km || 
|-id=579 bgcolor=#fefefe
| 245579 ||  || — || October 31, 2005 || Catalina || CSS || — || align=right | 2.6 km || 
|-id=580 bgcolor=#d6d6d6
| 245580 ||  || — || October 23, 2005 || Catalina || CSS || — || align=right | 5.6 km || 
|-id=581 bgcolor=#d6d6d6
| 245581 ||  || — || October 29, 2005 || Catalina || CSS || — || align=right | 4.0 km || 
|-id=582 bgcolor=#d6d6d6
| 245582 ||  || — || October 29, 2005 || Catalina || CSS || — || align=right | 4.9 km || 
|-id=583 bgcolor=#d6d6d6
| 245583 ||  || — || October 29, 2005 || Kitt Peak || Spacewatch || — || align=right | 3.5 km || 
|-id=584 bgcolor=#fefefe
| 245584 ||  || — || October 27, 2005 || Kitt Peak || Spacewatch || — || align=right data-sort-value="0.89" | 890 m || 
|-id=585 bgcolor=#d6d6d6
| 245585 ||  || — || October 30, 2005 || Mount Lemmon || Mount Lemmon Survey || — || align=right | 4.4 km || 
|-id=586 bgcolor=#d6d6d6
| 245586 ||  || — || October 27, 2005 || Palomar || NEAT || — || align=right | 2.4 km || 
|-id=587 bgcolor=#d6d6d6
| 245587 ||  || — || October 30, 2005 || Mount Lemmon || Mount Lemmon Survey || — || align=right | 3.9 km || 
|-id=588 bgcolor=#d6d6d6
| 245588 ||  || — || October 31, 2005 || Kitt Peak || Spacewatch || — || align=right | 3.2 km || 
|-id=589 bgcolor=#fefefe
| 245589 ||  || — || October 25, 2005 || Mount Lemmon || Mount Lemmon Survey || — || align=right data-sort-value="0.93" | 930 m || 
|-id=590 bgcolor=#d6d6d6
| 245590 ||  || — || October 22, 2005 || Catalina || CSS || — || align=right | 3.7 km || 
|-id=591 bgcolor=#d6d6d6
| 245591 ||  || — || October 25, 2005 || Catalina || CSS || TIR || align=right | 2.6 km || 
|-id=592 bgcolor=#d6d6d6
| 245592 ||  || — || October 27, 2005 || Catalina || CSS || LIX || align=right | 4.9 km || 
|-id=593 bgcolor=#d6d6d6
| 245593 ||  || — || November 1, 2005 || Socorro || LINEAR || — || align=right | 4.5 km || 
|-id=594 bgcolor=#d6d6d6
| 245594 ||  || — || November 3, 2005 || Mount Lemmon || Mount Lemmon Survey || — || align=right | 3.7 km || 
|-id=595 bgcolor=#d6d6d6
| 245595 ||  || — || November 3, 2005 || Mount Lemmon || Mount Lemmon Survey || — || align=right | 4.1 km || 
|-id=596 bgcolor=#d6d6d6
| 245596 ||  || — || November 1, 2005 || Mount Lemmon || Mount Lemmon Survey || — || align=right | 4.9 km || 
|-id=597 bgcolor=#d6d6d6
| 245597 ||  || — || November 6, 2005 || Socorro || LINEAR || EOS || align=right | 3.3 km || 
|-id=598 bgcolor=#d6d6d6
| 245598 ||  || — || November 3, 2005 || Mount Lemmon || Mount Lemmon Survey || — || align=right | 3.6 km || 
|-id=599 bgcolor=#fefefe
| 245599 ||  || — || November 6, 2005 || Mount Lemmon || Mount Lemmon Survey || — || align=right data-sort-value="0.97" | 970 m || 
|-id=600 bgcolor=#d6d6d6
| 245600 ||  || — || November 5, 2005 || Catalina || CSS || ALA || align=right | 5.5 km || 
|}

245601–245700 

|-bgcolor=#fefefe
| 245601 ||  || — || November 6, 2005 || Kitt Peak || Spacewatch || V || align=right data-sort-value="0.80" | 800 m || 
|-id=602 bgcolor=#d6d6d6
| 245602 ||  || — || November 21, 2005 || Socorro || LINEAR || EUP || align=right | 6.9 km || 
|-id=603 bgcolor=#d6d6d6
| 245603 ||  || — || November 22, 2005 || Socorro || LINEAR || EUP || align=right | 6.9 km || 
|-id=604 bgcolor=#fefefe
| 245604 ||  || — || November 21, 2005 || Catalina || CSS || — || align=right | 1.3 km || 
|-id=605 bgcolor=#fefefe
| 245605 ||  || — || November 21, 2005 || Kitt Peak || Spacewatch || V || align=right data-sort-value="0.93" | 930 m || 
|-id=606 bgcolor=#d6d6d6
| 245606 ||  || — || November 21, 2005 || Kitt Peak || Spacewatch || — || align=right | 4.2 km || 
|-id=607 bgcolor=#d6d6d6
| 245607 ||  || — || November 22, 2005 || Kitt Peak || Spacewatch || — || align=right | 6.5 km || 
|-id=608 bgcolor=#d6d6d6
| 245608 ||  || — || November 22, 2005 || Kitt Peak || Spacewatch || THM || align=right | 5.0 km || 
|-id=609 bgcolor=#d6d6d6
| 245609 ||  || — || November 25, 2005 || Mount Lemmon || Mount Lemmon Survey || HYG || align=right | 3.9 km || 
|-id=610 bgcolor=#d6d6d6
| 245610 ||  || — || November 21, 2005 || Kitt Peak || Spacewatch || — || align=right | 4.7 km || 
|-id=611 bgcolor=#E9E9E9
| 245611 ||  || — || November 21, 2005 || Kitt Peak || Spacewatch || — || align=right | 2.6 km || 
|-id=612 bgcolor=#d6d6d6
| 245612 ||  || — || November 21, 2005 || Catalina || CSS || HYG || align=right | 4.0 km || 
|-id=613 bgcolor=#fefefe
| 245613 ||  || — || November 21, 2005 || Palomar || NEAT || — || align=right | 1.5 km || 
|-id=614 bgcolor=#d6d6d6
| 245614 ||  || — || November 28, 2005 || Socorro || LINEAR || — || align=right | 4.4 km || 
|-id=615 bgcolor=#fefefe
| 245615 ||  || — || November 28, 2005 || Mount Lemmon || Mount Lemmon Survey || — || align=right data-sort-value="0.98" | 980 m || 
|-id=616 bgcolor=#E9E9E9
| 245616 ||  || — || November 30, 2005 || Anderson Mesa || LONEOS || KON || align=right | 3.5 km || 
|-id=617 bgcolor=#fefefe
| 245617 ||  || — || November 30, 2005 || Kitt Peak || Spacewatch || — || align=right | 1.2 km || 
|-id=618 bgcolor=#fefefe
| 245618 ||  || — || November 25, 2005 || Mount Lemmon || Mount Lemmon Survey || — || align=right data-sort-value="0.88" | 880 m || 
|-id=619 bgcolor=#fefefe
| 245619 ||  || — || November 30, 2005 || Kitt Peak || Spacewatch || — || align=right data-sort-value="0.60" | 600 m || 
|-id=620 bgcolor=#fefefe
| 245620 ||  || — || November 28, 2005 || Kitt Peak || Spacewatch || — || align=right data-sort-value="0.92" | 920 m || 
|-id=621 bgcolor=#fefefe
| 245621 ||  || — || November 28, 2005 || Socorro || LINEAR || FLO || align=right data-sort-value="0.92" | 920 m || 
|-id=622 bgcolor=#d6d6d6
| 245622 ||  || — || November 29, 2005 || Kitt Peak || Spacewatch || — || align=right | 4.7 km || 
|-id=623 bgcolor=#fefefe
| 245623 ||  || — || November 21, 2005 || Catalina || CSS || — || align=right | 1.4 km || 
|-id=624 bgcolor=#d6d6d6
| 245624 ||  || — || November 25, 2005 || Catalina || CSS || URS || align=right | 6.3 km || 
|-id=625 bgcolor=#d6d6d6
| 245625 ||  || — || November 28, 2005 || Catalina || CSS || EOS || align=right | 3.9 km || 
|-id=626 bgcolor=#d6d6d6
| 245626 ||  || — || November 25, 2005 || Kitt Peak || Spacewatch || — || align=right | 4.3 km || 
|-id=627 bgcolor=#fefefe
| 245627 ||  || — || December 4, 2005 || Socorro || LINEAR || H || align=right data-sort-value="0.90" | 900 m || 
|-id=628 bgcolor=#fefefe
| 245628 ||  || — || December 1, 2005 || Mount Lemmon || Mount Lemmon Survey || — || align=right | 1.0 km || 
|-id=629 bgcolor=#fefefe
| 245629 ||  || — || December 6, 2005 || Junk Bond || D. Healy || — || align=right data-sort-value="0.81" | 810 m || 
|-id=630 bgcolor=#fefefe
| 245630 ||  || — || December 2, 2005 || Kitt Peak || Spacewatch || — || align=right data-sort-value="0.89" | 890 m || 
|-id=631 bgcolor=#fefefe
| 245631 ||  || — || December 2, 2005 || Kitt Peak || Spacewatch || — || align=right | 1.7 km || 
|-id=632 bgcolor=#fefefe
| 245632 ||  || — || December 4, 2005 || Kitt Peak || Spacewatch || — || align=right data-sort-value="0.88" | 880 m || 
|-id=633 bgcolor=#d6d6d6
| 245633 ||  || — || December 5, 2005 || Catalina || CSS || MEL || align=right | 3.9 km || 
|-id=634 bgcolor=#fefefe
| 245634 ||  || — || December 10, 2005 || Kitt Peak || Spacewatch || FLO || align=right data-sort-value="0.72" | 720 m || 
|-id=635 bgcolor=#fefefe
| 245635 ||  || — || December 21, 2005 || Catalina || CSS || H || align=right data-sort-value="0.89" | 890 m || 
|-id=636 bgcolor=#fefefe
| 245636 ||  || — || December 21, 2005 || Kitt Peak || Spacewatch || — || align=right data-sort-value="0.98" | 980 m || 
|-id=637 bgcolor=#fefefe
| 245637 ||  || — || December 20, 2005 || Junk Bond || D. Healy || — || align=right data-sort-value="0.83" | 830 m || 
|-id=638 bgcolor=#d6d6d6
| 245638 ||  || — || December 22, 2005 || Kitt Peak || Spacewatch || — || align=right | 4.9 km || 
|-id=639 bgcolor=#d6d6d6
| 245639 ||  || — || December 24, 2005 || Kitt Peak || Spacewatch || THM || align=right | 4.3 km || 
|-id=640 bgcolor=#fefefe
| 245640 ||  || — || December 25, 2005 || Kitt Peak || Spacewatch || — || align=right | 2.2 km || 
|-id=641 bgcolor=#E9E9E9
| 245641 ||  || — || December 22, 2005 || Kitt Peak || Spacewatch || — || align=right | 3.4 km || 
|-id=642 bgcolor=#fefefe
| 245642 ||  || — || December 24, 2005 || Kitt Peak || Spacewatch || V || align=right data-sort-value="0.76" | 760 m || 
|-id=643 bgcolor=#fefefe
| 245643 ||  || — || December 24, 2005 || Kitt Peak || Spacewatch || FLO || align=right data-sort-value="0.67" | 670 m || 
|-id=644 bgcolor=#fefefe
| 245644 ||  || — || December 25, 2005 || Kitt Peak || Spacewatch || SUL || align=right | 2.3 km || 
|-id=645 bgcolor=#fefefe
| 245645 ||  || — || December 24, 2005 || Kitt Peak || Spacewatch || NYS || align=right data-sort-value="0.87" | 870 m || 
|-id=646 bgcolor=#fefefe
| 245646 ||  || — || December 25, 2005 || Kitt Peak || Spacewatch || — || align=right data-sort-value="0.92" | 920 m || 
|-id=647 bgcolor=#fefefe
| 245647 ||  || — || December 28, 2005 || Kitt Peak || Spacewatch || — || align=right data-sort-value="0.91" | 910 m || 
|-id=648 bgcolor=#fefefe
| 245648 ||  || — || December 24, 2005 || Kitt Peak || Spacewatch || — || align=right data-sort-value="0.83" | 830 m || 
|-id=649 bgcolor=#fefefe
| 245649 ||  || — || December 25, 2005 || Mount Lemmon || Mount Lemmon Survey || NYS || align=right data-sort-value="0.74" | 740 m || 
|-id=650 bgcolor=#fefefe
| 245650 ||  || — || December 28, 2005 || Kitt Peak || Spacewatch || — || align=right data-sort-value="0.82" | 820 m || 
|-id=651 bgcolor=#fefefe
| 245651 ||  || — || December 28, 2005 || Mount Lemmon || Mount Lemmon Survey || ERI || align=right | 2.5 km || 
|-id=652 bgcolor=#fefefe
| 245652 ||  || — || December 29, 2005 || Mount Lemmon || Mount Lemmon Survey || — || align=right data-sort-value="0.73" | 730 m || 
|-id=653 bgcolor=#d6d6d6
| 245653 ||  || — || December 25, 2005 || Kitt Peak || Spacewatch || — || align=right | 5.3 km || 
|-id=654 bgcolor=#fefefe
| 245654 ||  || — || December 25, 2005 || Mount Lemmon || Mount Lemmon Survey || FLO || align=right | 1.0 km || 
|-id=655 bgcolor=#fefefe
| 245655 ||  || — || December 25, 2005 || Mount Lemmon || Mount Lemmon Survey || NYS || align=right data-sort-value="0.81" | 810 m || 
|-id=656 bgcolor=#fefefe
| 245656 ||  || — || December 23, 2005 || Socorro || LINEAR || CIM || align=right | 3.2 km || 
|-id=657 bgcolor=#fefefe
| 245657 ||  || — || December 29, 2005 || Catalina || CSS || — || align=right | 1.8 km || 
|-id=658 bgcolor=#fefefe
| 245658 ||  || — || December 31, 2005 || Socorro || LINEAR || — || align=right | 1.0 km || 
|-id=659 bgcolor=#fefefe
| 245659 ||  || — || December 30, 2005 || Kitt Peak || Spacewatch || — || align=right | 1.1 km || 
|-id=660 bgcolor=#E9E9E9
| 245660 ||  || — || December 25, 2005 || Mount Lemmon || Mount Lemmon Survey || — || align=right | 3.7 km || 
|-id=661 bgcolor=#fefefe
| 245661 ||  || — || December 25, 2005 || Mount Lemmon || Mount Lemmon Survey || — || align=right data-sort-value="0.75" | 750 m || 
|-id=662 bgcolor=#fefefe
| 245662 ||  || — || January 2, 2006 || Mount Lemmon || Mount Lemmon Survey || CHL || align=right | 1.5 km || 
|-id=663 bgcolor=#E9E9E9
| 245663 ||  || — || January 5, 2006 || Kitt Peak || Spacewatch || — || align=right | 1.2 km || 
|-id=664 bgcolor=#fefefe
| 245664 ||  || — || January 5, 2006 || Catalina || CSS || FLO || align=right data-sort-value="0.70" | 700 m || 
|-id=665 bgcolor=#fefefe
| 245665 ||  || — || January 7, 2006 || Mount Lemmon || Mount Lemmon Survey || — || align=right | 2.3 km || 
|-id=666 bgcolor=#d6d6d6
| 245666 ||  || — || January 7, 2006 || Mount Lemmon || Mount Lemmon Survey || — || align=right | 3.7 km || 
|-id=667 bgcolor=#E9E9E9
| 245667 ||  || — || January 7, 2006 || Catalina || CSS || EUN || align=right | 2.1 km || 
|-id=668 bgcolor=#E9E9E9
| 245668 ||  || — || January 6, 2006 || Socorro || LINEAR || ADE || align=right | 4.5 km || 
|-id=669 bgcolor=#fefefe
| 245669 ||  || — || January 20, 2006 || Kitt Peak || Spacewatch || MAS || align=right data-sort-value="0.76" | 760 m || 
|-id=670 bgcolor=#fefefe
| 245670 ||  || — || January 19, 2006 || Catalina || CSS || — || align=right | 2.7 km || 
|-id=671 bgcolor=#fefefe
| 245671 ||  || — || January 20, 2006 || Kitt Peak || Spacewatch || — || align=right data-sort-value="0.85" | 850 m || 
|-id=672 bgcolor=#fefefe
| 245672 ||  || — || January 23, 2006 || Mount Lemmon || Mount Lemmon Survey || NYS || align=right data-sort-value="0.92" | 920 m || 
|-id=673 bgcolor=#fefefe
| 245673 ||  || — || January 23, 2006 || Mount Lemmon || Mount Lemmon Survey || — || align=right data-sort-value="0.98" | 980 m || 
|-id=674 bgcolor=#fefefe
| 245674 ||  || — || January 22, 2006 || Mount Lemmon || Mount Lemmon Survey || — || align=right data-sort-value="0.76" | 760 m || 
|-id=675 bgcolor=#fefefe
| 245675 ||  || — || January 20, 2006 || Kitt Peak || Spacewatch || V || align=right data-sort-value="0.84" | 840 m || 
|-id=676 bgcolor=#fefefe
| 245676 ||  || — || January 20, 2006 || Kitt Peak || Spacewatch || — || align=right | 1.9 km || 
|-id=677 bgcolor=#fefefe
| 245677 ||  || — || January 21, 2006 || Mount Lemmon || Mount Lemmon Survey || FLO || align=right data-sort-value="0.71" | 710 m || 
|-id=678 bgcolor=#E9E9E9
| 245678 ||  || — || January 25, 2006 || Kitt Peak || Spacewatch || — || align=right | 2.7 km || 
|-id=679 bgcolor=#E9E9E9
| 245679 ||  || — || January 23, 2006 || Kitt Peak || Spacewatch || — || align=right | 3.9 km || 
|-id=680 bgcolor=#fefefe
| 245680 ||  || — || January 25, 2006 || Kitt Peak || Spacewatch || V || align=right data-sort-value="0.69" | 690 m || 
|-id=681 bgcolor=#fefefe
| 245681 ||  || — || January 25, 2006 || Kitt Peak || Spacewatch || FLO || align=right data-sort-value="0.71" | 710 m || 
|-id=682 bgcolor=#C2FFFF
| 245682 ||  || — || January 26, 2006 || Kitt Peak || Spacewatch || L5 || align=right | 9.6 km || 
|-id=683 bgcolor=#fefefe
| 245683 ||  || — || January 26, 2006 || Kitt Peak || Spacewatch || MAS || align=right data-sort-value="0.84" | 840 m || 
|-id=684 bgcolor=#E9E9E9
| 245684 ||  || — || January 26, 2006 || Kitt Peak || Spacewatch || CLO || align=right | 1.6 km || 
|-id=685 bgcolor=#fefefe
| 245685 ||  || — || January 26, 2006 || Kitt Peak || Spacewatch || NYS || align=right data-sort-value="0.75" | 750 m || 
|-id=686 bgcolor=#fefefe
| 245686 ||  || — || January 26, 2006 || Kitt Peak || Spacewatch || — || align=right data-sort-value="0.99" | 990 m || 
|-id=687 bgcolor=#fefefe
| 245687 ||  || — || January 26, 2006 || Mount Lemmon || Mount Lemmon Survey || — || align=right data-sort-value="0.77" | 770 m || 
|-id=688 bgcolor=#E9E9E9
| 245688 ||  || — || January 26, 2006 || Mount Lemmon || Mount Lemmon Survey || EUN || align=right | 1.5 km || 
|-id=689 bgcolor=#fefefe
| 245689 ||  || — || January 26, 2006 || Kitt Peak || Spacewatch || — || align=right data-sort-value="0.86" | 860 m || 
|-id=690 bgcolor=#fefefe
| 245690 ||  || — || January 26, 2006 || Mount Lemmon || Mount Lemmon Survey || — || align=right | 1.0 km || 
|-id=691 bgcolor=#E9E9E9
| 245691 ||  || — || January 22, 2006 || Mount Lemmon || Mount Lemmon Survey || NEM || align=right | 2.6 km || 
|-id=692 bgcolor=#fefefe
| 245692 ||  || — || January 25, 2006 || Kitt Peak || Spacewatch || — || align=right | 1.0 km || 
|-id=693 bgcolor=#fefefe
| 245693 ||  || — || January 26, 2006 || Kitt Peak || Spacewatch || — || align=right data-sort-value="0.97" | 970 m || 
|-id=694 bgcolor=#fefefe
| 245694 ||  || — || January 26, 2006 || Mount Lemmon || Mount Lemmon Survey || FLO || align=right data-sort-value="0.85" | 850 m || 
|-id=695 bgcolor=#fefefe
| 245695 ||  || — || January 26, 2006 || Mount Lemmon || Mount Lemmon Survey || V || align=right data-sort-value="0.78" | 780 m || 
|-id=696 bgcolor=#fefefe
| 245696 ||  || — || January 28, 2006 || Mount Lemmon || Mount Lemmon Survey || — || align=right | 1.1 km || 
|-id=697 bgcolor=#fefefe
| 245697 ||  || — || January 28, 2006 || Kitt Peak || Spacewatch || NYS || align=right | 1.0 km || 
|-id=698 bgcolor=#fefefe
| 245698 ||  || — || January 31, 2006 || Catalina || CSS || — || align=right | 2.5 km || 
|-id=699 bgcolor=#E9E9E9
| 245699 ||  || — || January 28, 2006 || Anderson Mesa || LONEOS || — || align=right | 1.5 km || 
|-id=700 bgcolor=#E9E9E9
| 245700 ||  || — || January 30, 2006 || Kitt Peak || Spacewatch || HOF || align=right | 3.1 km || 
|}

245701–245800 

|-bgcolor=#fefefe
| 245701 ||  || — || January 31, 2006 || Kitt Peak || Spacewatch || — || align=right | 1.1 km || 
|-id=702 bgcolor=#fefefe
| 245702 ||  || — || January 31, 2006 || Kitt Peak || Spacewatch || — || align=right data-sort-value="0.88" | 880 m || 
|-id=703 bgcolor=#fefefe
| 245703 ||  || — || January 31, 2006 || Kitt Peak || Spacewatch || V || align=right data-sort-value="0.85" | 850 m || 
|-id=704 bgcolor=#fefefe
| 245704 ||  || — || January 31, 2006 || Kitt Peak || Spacewatch || — || align=right | 1.7 km || 
|-id=705 bgcolor=#fefefe
| 245705 ||  || — || January 31, 2006 || Kitt Peak || Spacewatch || ERI || align=right | 2.1 km || 
|-id=706 bgcolor=#d6d6d6
| 245706 ||  || — || January 23, 2006 || Kitt Peak || Spacewatch || — || align=right | 5.5 km || 
|-id=707 bgcolor=#d6d6d6
| 245707 ||  || — || January 28, 2006 || Mount Lemmon || Mount Lemmon Survey || EOS || align=right | 3.2 km || 
|-id=708 bgcolor=#fefefe
| 245708 ||  || — || February 1, 2006 || Kitt Peak || Spacewatch || — || align=right data-sort-value="0.99" | 990 m || 
|-id=709 bgcolor=#fefefe
| 245709 ||  || — || February 1, 2006 || Kitt Peak || Spacewatch || — || align=right | 1.1 km || 
|-id=710 bgcolor=#E9E9E9
| 245710 ||  || — || February 1, 2006 || Kitt Peak || Spacewatch || — || align=right | 2.8 km || 
|-id=711 bgcolor=#fefefe
| 245711 ||  || — || February 2, 2006 || Kitt Peak || Spacewatch || NYS || align=right data-sort-value="0.86" | 860 m || 
|-id=712 bgcolor=#d6d6d6
| 245712 ||  || — || February 2, 2006 || Mount Lemmon || Mount Lemmon Survey || — || align=right | 3.5 km || 
|-id=713 bgcolor=#E9E9E9
| 245713 ||  || — || February 2, 2006 || Mount Lemmon || Mount Lemmon Survey || NEM || align=right | 2.1 km || 
|-id=714 bgcolor=#fefefe
| 245714 ||  || — || February 3, 2006 || Kitt Peak || Spacewatch || MAS || align=right data-sort-value="0.68" | 680 m || 
|-id=715 bgcolor=#fefefe
| 245715 ||  || — || February 3, 2006 || Socorro || LINEAR || MAS || align=right data-sort-value="0.89" | 890 m || 
|-id=716 bgcolor=#fefefe
| 245716 ||  || — || February 6, 2006 || Mount Lemmon || Mount Lemmon Survey || MAS || align=right data-sort-value="0.75" | 750 m || 
|-id=717 bgcolor=#fefefe
| 245717 ||  || — || February 6, 2006 || Mount Lemmon || Mount Lemmon Survey || — || align=right data-sort-value="0.82" | 820 m || 
|-id=718 bgcolor=#fefefe
| 245718 ||  || — || February 6, 2006 || Kitt Peak || Spacewatch || — || align=right data-sort-value="0.94" | 940 m || 
|-id=719 bgcolor=#fefefe
| 245719 ||  || — || February 1, 2006 || Kitt Peak || Spacewatch || — || align=right | 1.2 km || 
|-id=720 bgcolor=#fefefe
| 245720 ||  || — || February 20, 2006 || Kitt Peak || Spacewatch || NYS || align=right data-sort-value="0.78" | 780 m || 
|-id=721 bgcolor=#fefefe
| 245721 ||  || — || February 20, 2006 || Kitt Peak || Spacewatch || NYS || align=right data-sort-value="0.79" | 790 m || 
|-id=722 bgcolor=#fefefe
| 245722 ||  || — || February 21, 2006 || Mount Lemmon || Mount Lemmon Survey || NYS || align=right data-sort-value="0.66" | 660 m || 
|-id=723 bgcolor=#E9E9E9
| 245723 ||  || — || February 22, 2006 || Catalina || CSS || — || align=right | 4.8 km || 
|-id=724 bgcolor=#fefefe
| 245724 ||  || — || February 20, 2006 || Kitt Peak || Spacewatch || — || align=right data-sort-value="0.78" | 780 m || 
|-id=725 bgcolor=#fefefe
| 245725 ||  || — || February 20, 2006 || Kitt Peak || Spacewatch || NYS || align=right data-sort-value="0.66" | 660 m || 
|-id=726 bgcolor=#fefefe
| 245726 ||  || — || February 20, 2006 || Kitt Peak || Spacewatch || NYS || align=right data-sort-value="0.75" | 750 m || 
|-id=727 bgcolor=#E9E9E9
| 245727 ||  || — || February 20, 2006 || Mount Lemmon || Mount Lemmon Survey || — || align=right | 1.2 km || 
|-id=728 bgcolor=#fefefe
| 245728 ||  || — || February 21, 2006 || Mount Lemmon || Mount Lemmon Survey || FLO || align=right data-sort-value="0.94" | 940 m || 
|-id=729 bgcolor=#fefefe
| 245729 ||  || — || February 21, 2006 || Mount Lemmon || Mount Lemmon Survey || — || align=right | 1.3 km || 
|-id=730 bgcolor=#fefefe
| 245730 ||  || — || February 23, 2006 || Kitt Peak || Spacewatch || FLO || align=right data-sort-value="0.73" | 730 m || 
|-id=731 bgcolor=#fefefe
| 245731 ||  || — || February 24, 2006 || Kitt Peak || Spacewatch || FLO || align=right data-sort-value="0.89" | 890 m || 
|-id=732 bgcolor=#fefefe
| 245732 ||  || — || February 20, 2006 || Catalina || CSS || NYS || align=right data-sort-value="0.83" | 830 m || 
|-id=733 bgcolor=#d6d6d6
| 245733 ||  || — || February 20, 2006 || Mount Lemmon || Mount Lemmon Survey || — || align=right | 5.1 km || 
|-id=734 bgcolor=#fefefe
| 245734 ||  || — || February 21, 2006 || Mount Lemmon || Mount Lemmon Survey || MAS || align=right data-sort-value="0.75" | 750 m || 
|-id=735 bgcolor=#fefefe
| 245735 ||  || — || February 24, 2006 || Kitt Peak || Spacewatch || — || align=right data-sort-value="0.86" | 860 m || 
|-id=736 bgcolor=#fefefe
| 245736 ||  || — || February 25, 2006 || Kitt Peak || Spacewatch || NYS || align=right data-sort-value="0.78" | 780 m || 
|-id=737 bgcolor=#fefefe
| 245737 ||  || — || February 25, 2006 || Kitt Peak || Spacewatch || — || align=right | 1.0 km || 
|-id=738 bgcolor=#fefefe
| 245738 ||  || — || February 25, 2006 || Kitt Peak || Spacewatch || — || align=right | 1.0 km || 
|-id=739 bgcolor=#fefefe
| 245739 ||  || — || February 27, 2006 || Kitt Peak || Spacewatch || — || align=right data-sort-value="0.97" | 970 m || 
|-id=740 bgcolor=#fefefe
| 245740 ||  || — || February 23, 2006 || Anderson Mesa || LONEOS || — || align=right | 1.8 km || 
|-id=741 bgcolor=#E9E9E9
| 245741 ||  || — || February 25, 2006 || Kitt Peak || Spacewatch || — || align=right | 1.8 km || 
|-id=742 bgcolor=#fefefe
| 245742 ||  || — || February 25, 2006 || Kitt Peak || Spacewatch || FLO || align=right data-sort-value="0.84" | 840 m || 
|-id=743 bgcolor=#fefefe
| 245743 ||  || — || February 25, 2006 || Kitt Peak || Spacewatch || — || align=right | 1.3 km || 
|-id=744 bgcolor=#fefefe
| 245744 ||  || — || February 25, 2006 || Kitt Peak || Spacewatch || FLO || align=right data-sort-value="0.77" | 770 m || 
|-id=745 bgcolor=#d6d6d6
| 245745 ||  || — || February 25, 2006 || Kitt Peak || Spacewatch || — || align=right | 4.1 km || 
|-id=746 bgcolor=#fefefe
| 245746 ||  || — || February 25, 2006 || Mount Lemmon || Mount Lemmon Survey || — || align=right data-sort-value="0.79" | 790 m || 
|-id=747 bgcolor=#fefefe
| 245747 ||  || — || February 25, 2006 || Mount Lemmon || Mount Lemmon Survey || NYS || align=right data-sort-value="0.76" | 760 m || 
|-id=748 bgcolor=#fefefe
| 245748 ||  || — || February 25, 2006 || Kitt Peak || Spacewatch || — || align=right | 1.00 km || 
|-id=749 bgcolor=#fefefe
| 245749 ||  || — || February 27, 2006 || Kitt Peak || Spacewatch || — || align=right data-sort-value="0.99" | 990 m || 
|-id=750 bgcolor=#d6d6d6
| 245750 ||  || — || February 27, 2006 || Mount Lemmon || Mount Lemmon Survey || — || align=right | 4.1 km || 
|-id=751 bgcolor=#fefefe
| 245751 ||  || — || February 27, 2006 || Kitt Peak || Spacewatch || — || align=right | 2.0 km || 
|-id=752 bgcolor=#fefefe
| 245752 ||  || — || February 27, 2006 || Mount Lemmon || Mount Lemmon Survey || CHL || align=right | 2.7 km || 
|-id=753 bgcolor=#fefefe
| 245753 ||  || — || February 27, 2006 || Mount Lemmon || Mount Lemmon Survey || — || align=right | 1.1 km || 
|-id=754 bgcolor=#fefefe
| 245754 ||  || — || February 27, 2006 || Kitt Peak || Spacewatch || NYS || align=right data-sort-value="0.71" | 710 m || 
|-id=755 bgcolor=#E9E9E9
| 245755 ||  || — || February 27, 2006 || Kitt Peak || Spacewatch || BRU || align=right | 3.9 km || 
|-id=756 bgcolor=#fefefe
| 245756 ||  || — || February 25, 2006 || Kitt Peak || Spacewatch || — || align=right | 1.0 km || 
|-id=757 bgcolor=#fefefe
| 245757 ||  || — || March 2, 2006 || Kitt Peak || Spacewatch || MAS || align=right data-sort-value="0.73" | 730 m || 
|-id=758 bgcolor=#fefefe
| 245758 ||  || — || March 2, 2006 || Kitt Peak || Spacewatch || NYS || align=right data-sort-value="0.78" | 780 m || 
|-id=759 bgcolor=#fefefe
| 245759 ||  || — || March 2, 2006 || Kitt Peak || Spacewatch || NYS || align=right data-sort-value="0.84" | 840 m || 
|-id=760 bgcolor=#fefefe
| 245760 ||  || — || March 2, 2006 || Kitt Peak || Spacewatch || NYS || align=right data-sort-value="0.73" | 730 m || 
|-id=761 bgcolor=#fefefe
| 245761 ||  || — || March 2, 2006 || Kitt Peak || Spacewatch || — || align=right | 1.6 km || 
|-id=762 bgcolor=#fefefe
| 245762 ||  || — || March 5, 2006 || Kitt Peak || Spacewatch || — || align=right data-sort-value="0.88" | 880 m || 
|-id=763 bgcolor=#fefefe
| 245763 ||  || — || March 5, 2006 || Kitt Peak || Spacewatch || — || align=right | 1.5 km || 
|-id=764 bgcolor=#E9E9E9
| 245764 ||  || — || March 23, 2006 || Mount Lemmon || Mount Lemmon Survey || — || align=right | 2.0 km || 
|-id=765 bgcolor=#d6d6d6
| 245765 ||  || — || March 23, 2006 || Kitt Peak || Spacewatch || — || align=right | 4.1 km || 
|-id=766 bgcolor=#fefefe
| 245766 ||  || — || March 23, 2006 || Kitt Peak || Spacewatch || — || align=right | 1.1 km || 
|-id=767 bgcolor=#fefefe
| 245767 ||  || — || March 24, 2006 || Kitt Peak || Spacewatch || — || align=right | 1.4 km || 
|-id=768 bgcolor=#fefefe
| 245768 ||  || — || March 24, 2006 || Kitt Peak || Spacewatch || NYS || align=right data-sort-value="0.91" | 910 m || 
|-id=769 bgcolor=#fefefe
| 245769 ||  || — || March 24, 2006 || Mount Lemmon || Mount Lemmon Survey || NYS || align=right data-sort-value="0.88" | 880 m || 
|-id=770 bgcolor=#fefefe
| 245770 ||  || — || March 23, 2006 || Kitt Peak || Spacewatch || — || align=right | 1.2 km || 
|-id=771 bgcolor=#fefefe
| 245771 ||  || — || March 23, 2006 || Kitt Peak || Spacewatch || — || align=right | 1.8 km || 
|-id=772 bgcolor=#d6d6d6
| 245772 ||  || — || March 25, 2006 || Catalina || CSS || — || align=right | 5.5 km || 
|-id=773 bgcolor=#fefefe
| 245773 ||  || — || April 2, 2006 || Kitt Peak || Spacewatch || NYS || align=right data-sort-value="0.80" | 800 m || 
|-id=774 bgcolor=#E9E9E9
| 245774 ||  || — || April 2, 2006 || Kitt Peak || Spacewatch || NEM || align=right | 2.6 km || 
|-id=775 bgcolor=#fefefe
| 245775 ||  || — || April 2, 2006 || Mount Lemmon || Mount Lemmon Survey || V || align=right data-sort-value="0.95" | 950 m || 
|-id=776 bgcolor=#d6d6d6
| 245776 ||  || — || April 2, 2006 || Kitt Peak || Spacewatch || — || align=right | 3.6 km || 
|-id=777 bgcolor=#E9E9E9
| 245777 ||  || — || April 2, 2006 || Kitt Peak || Spacewatch || — || align=right | 2.8 km || 
|-id=778 bgcolor=#E9E9E9
| 245778 ||  || — || April 2, 2006 || Kitt Peak || Spacewatch || — || align=right | 1.8 km || 
|-id=779 bgcolor=#fefefe
| 245779 ||  || — || April 7, 2006 || Socorro || LINEAR || — || align=right | 2.8 km || 
|-id=780 bgcolor=#fefefe
| 245780 ||  || — || April 7, 2006 || Anderson Mesa || LONEOS || FLO || align=right | 1.5 km || 
|-id=781 bgcolor=#E9E9E9
| 245781 ||  || — || April 9, 2006 || Siding Spring || SSS || — || align=right | 5.0 km || 
|-id=782 bgcolor=#fefefe
| 245782 ||  || — || April 7, 2006 || Mount Lemmon || Mount Lemmon Survey || NYS || align=right data-sort-value="0.88" | 880 m || 
|-id=783 bgcolor=#E9E9E9
| 245783 ||  || — || April 18, 2006 || Kitt Peak || Spacewatch || — || align=right | 1.9 km || 
|-id=784 bgcolor=#fefefe
| 245784 ||  || — || April 18, 2006 || Kitt Peak || Spacewatch || — || align=right | 1.1 km || 
|-id=785 bgcolor=#fefefe
| 245785 ||  || — || April 18, 2006 || Anderson Mesa || LONEOS || — || align=right | 1.4 km || 
|-id=786 bgcolor=#fefefe
| 245786 ||  || — || April 19, 2006 || Palomar || NEAT || FLO || align=right data-sort-value="0.83" | 830 m || 
|-id=787 bgcolor=#fefefe
| 245787 ||  || — || April 20, 2006 || Kitt Peak || Spacewatch || NYS || align=right data-sort-value="0.76" | 760 m || 
|-id=788 bgcolor=#fefefe
| 245788 ||  || — || April 19, 2006 || Anderson Mesa || LONEOS || — || align=right | 2.7 km || 
|-id=789 bgcolor=#fefefe
| 245789 ||  || — || April 20, 2006 || Kitt Peak || Spacewatch || NYS || align=right data-sort-value="0.78" | 780 m || 
|-id=790 bgcolor=#d6d6d6
| 245790 ||  || — || April 19, 2006 || Kitt Peak || Spacewatch || — || align=right | 3.9 km || 
|-id=791 bgcolor=#fefefe
| 245791 ||  || — || April 20, 2006 || Kitt Peak || Spacewatch || NYS || align=right data-sort-value="0.67" | 670 m || 
|-id=792 bgcolor=#E9E9E9
| 245792 ||  || — || April 21, 2006 || Kitt Peak || Spacewatch || MAR || align=right | 1.0 km || 
|-id=793 bgcolor=#fefefe
| 245793 ||  || — || April 21, 2006 || Kitt Peak || Spacewatch || FLO || align=right | 2.0 km || 
|-id=794 bgcolor=#E9E9E9
| 245794 ||  || — || April 21, 2006 || Kitt Peak || Spacewatch || — || align=right | 3.5 km || 
|-id=795 bgcolor=#fefefe
| 245795 ||  || — || April 26, 2006 || Kitt Peak || Spacewatch || — || align=right data-sort-value="0.75" | 750 m || 
|-id=796 bgcolor=#E9E9E9
| 245796 ||  || — || April 19, 2006 || Catalina || CSS || — || align=right | 2.0 km || 
|-id=797 bgcolor=#d6d6d6
| 245797 ||  || — || April 24, 2006 || Anderson Mesa || LONEOS || — || align=right | 4.7 km || 
|-id=798 bgcolor=#fefefe
| 245798 ||  || — || April 24, 2006 || Kitt Peak || Spacewatch || MAS || align=right data-sort-value="0.82" | 820 m || 
|-id=799 bgcolor=#fefefe
| 245799 ||  || — || April 24, 2006 || Kitt Peak || Spacewatch || — || align=right | 1.5 km || 
|-id=800 bgcolor=#E9E9E9
| 245800 ||  || — || April 26, 2006 || Kitt Peak || Spacewatch || — || align=right | 1.1 km || 
|}

245801–245900 

|-bgcolor=#E9E9E9
| 245801 ||  || — || April 26, 2006 || Kitt Peak || Spacewatch || HNS || align=right | 2.0 km || 
|-id=802 bgcolor=#fefefe
| 245802 ||  || — || April 27, 2006 || Kitt Peak || Spacewatch || — || align=right | 1.2 km || 
|-id=803 bgcolor=#fefefe
| 245803 ||  || — || April 30, 2006 || Kitt Peak || Spacewatch || — || align=right data-sort-value="0.91" | 910 m || 
|-id=804 bgcolor=#d6d6d6
| 245804 ||  || — || April 29, 2006 || Siding Spring || SSS || — || align=right | 5.6 km || 
|-id=805 bgcolor=#fefefe
| 245805 ||  || — || April 30, 2006 || Kitt Peak || Spacewatch || NYS || align=right data-sort-value="0.65" | 650 m || 
|-id=806 bgcolor=#E9E9E9
| 245806 ||  || — || April 30, 2006 || Kitt Peak || Spacewatch || — || align=right | 1.4 km || 
|-id=807 bgcolor=#E9E9E9
| 245807 ||  || — || April 30, 2006 || Kitt Peak || Spacewatch || EUN || align=right | 1.1 km || 
|-id=808 bgcolor=#E9E9E9
| 245808 ||  || — || April 29, 2006 || Siding Spring || SSS || ADE || align=right | 3.9 km || 
|-id=809 bgcolor=#E9E9E9
| 245809 ||  || — || April 30, 2006 || Kitt Peak || Spacewatch || — || align=right | 2.1 km || 
|-id=810 bgcolor=#E9E9E9
| 245810 ||  || — || April 26, 2006 || Kitt Peak || Spacewatch || — || align=right | 1.7 km || 
|-id=811 bgcolor=#d6d6d6
| 245811 ||  || — || April 26, 2006 || Cerro Tololo || M. W. Buie || THM || align=right | 2.8 km || 
|-id=812 bgcolor=#fefefe
| 245812 ||  || — || May 1, 2006 || Reedy Creek || J. Broughton || — || align=right | 2.2 km || 
|-id=813 bgcolor=#fefefe
| 245813 ||  || — || May 1, 2006 || Socorro || LINEAR || NYS || align=right data-sort-value="0.74" | 740 m || 
|-id=814 bgcolor=#d6d6d6
| 245814 ||  || — || May 1, 2006 || Kitt Peak || Spacewatch || EOS || align=right | 3.3 km || 
|-id=815 bgcolor=#E9E9E9
| 245815 ||  || — || May 2, 2006 || Mount Lemmon || Mount Lemmon Survey || MIS || align=right | 2.9 km || 
|-id=816 bgcolor=#fefefe
| 245816 ||  || — || May 2, 2006 || Kitt Peak || Spacewatch || — || align=right | 1.7 km || 
|-id=817 bgcolor=#E9E9E9
| 245817 ||  || — || May 4, 2006 || Mount Lemmon || Mount Lemmon Survey || — || align=right | 2.9 km || 
|-id=818 bgcolor=#E9E9E9
| 245818 ||  || — || May 5, 2006 || Kitt Peak || Spacewatch || — || align=right | 1.3 km || 
|-id=819 bgcolor=#E9E9E9
| 245819 ||  || — || May 3, 2006 || Kitt Peak || Spacewatch || — || align=right | 1.1 km || 
|-id=820 bgcolor=#E9E9E9
| 245820 ||  || — || May 3, 2006 || Kitt Peak || Spacewatch || — || align=right | 1.3 km || 
|-id=821 bgcolor=#E9E9E9
| 245821 ||  || — || May 3, 2006 || Kitt Peak || Spacewatch || — || align=right | 3.7 km || 
|-id=822 bgcolor=#E9E9E9
| 245822 ||  || — || May 3, 2006 || Kitt Peak || Spacewatch || PAE || align=right | 4.1 km || 
|-id=823 bgcolor=#E9E9E9
| 245823 ||  || — || May 4, 2006 || Kitt Peak || Spacewatch || — || align=right | 1.1 km || 
|-id=824 bgcolor=#d6d6d6
| 245824 ||  || — || May 7, 2006 || Kitt Peak || Spacewatch || EUP || align=right | 5.5 km || 
|-id=825 bgcolor=#E9E9E9
| 245825 ||  || — || May 8, 2006 || Mount Lemmon || Mount Lemmon Survey || — || align=right | 1.3 km || 
|-id=826 bgcolor=#d6d6d6
| 245826 ||  || — || May 8, 2006 || Mount Lemmon || Mount Lemmon Survey || — || align=right | 3.9 km || 
|-id=827 bgcolor=#d6d6d6
| 245827 ||  || — || May 9, 2006 || Mount Lemmon || Mount Lemmon Survey || EOS || align=right | 3.0 km || 
|-id=828 bgcolor=#E9E9E9
| 245828 ||  || — || May 2, 2006 || Catalina || CSS || — || align=right | 3.6 km || 
|-id=829 bgcolor=#E9E9E9
| 245829 ||  || — || May 1, 2006 || Socorro || LINEAR || — || align=right | 2.7 km || 
|-id=830 bgcolor=#fefefe
| 245830 ||  || — || May 2, 2006 || Mount Lemmon || Mount Lemmon Survey || — || align=right | 1.2 km || 
|-id=831 bgcolor=#E9E9E9
| 245831 ||  || — || May 14, 2006 || Palomar || NEAT || JUN || align=right | 1.6 km || 
|-id=832 bgcolor=#E9E9E9
| 245832 ||  || — || May 18, 2006 || Catalina || CSS || MAR || align=right | 2.0 km || 
|-id=833 bgcolor=#fefefe
| 245833 ||  || — || May 18, 2006 || Palomar || NEAT || — || align=right | 1.0 km || 
|-id=834 bgcolor=#E9E9E9
| 245834 ||  || — || May 20, 2006 || Kitt Peak || Spacewatch || ADE || align=right | 3.6 km || 
|-id=835 bgcolor=#E9E9E9
| 245835 ||  || — || May 20, 2006 || Kitt Peak || Spacewatch || — || align=right | 2.8 km || 
|-id=836 bgcolor=#E9E9E9
| 245836 ||  || — || May 20, 2006 || Catalina || CSS || — || align=right | 1.6 km || 
|-id=837 bgcolor=#fefefe
| 245837 ||  || — || May 18, 2006 || Palomar || NEAT || NYS || align=right data-sort-value="0.89" | 890 m || 
|-id=838 bgcolor=#E9E9E9
| 245838 ||  || — || May 19, 2006 || Mount Lemmon || Mount Lemmon Survey || — || align=right | 1.7 km || 
|-id=839 bgcolor=#fefefe
| 245839 ||  || — || May 20, 2006 || Kitt Peak || Spacewatch || — || align=right | 1.3 km || 
|-id=840 bgcolor=#fefefe
| 245840 ||  || — || May 20, 2006 || Kitt Peak || Spacewatch || NYS || align=right data-sort-value="0.81" | 810 m || 
|-id=841 bgcolor=#E9E9E9
| 245841 ||  || — || May 21, 2006 || Mount Lemmon || Mount Lemmon Survey || — || align=right | 2.0 km || 
|-id=842 bgcolor=#E9E9E9
| 245842 ||  || — || May 21, 2006 || Mount Lemmon || Mount Lemmon Survey || — || align=right | 2.6 km || 
|-id=843 bgcolor=#E9E9E9
| 245843 ||  || — || May 22, 2006 || Kitt Peak || Spacewatch || — || align=right | 2.8 km || 
|-id=844 bgcolor=#d6d6d6
| 245844 ||  || — || May 23, 2006 || Mount Lemmon || Mount Lemmon Survey || — || align=right | 4.4 km || 
|-id=845 bgcolor=#fefefe
| 245845 ||  || — || May 23, 2006 || Kitt Peak || Spacewatch || — || align=right | 1.4 km || 
|-id=846 bgcolor=#E9E9E9
| 245846 ||  || — || May 24, 2006 || Palomar || NEAT || — || align=right | 1.7 km || 
|-id=847 bgcolor=#E9E9E9
| 245847 ||  || — || May 20, 2006 || Kitt Peak || Spacewatch || — || align=right | 2.9 km || 
|-id=848 bgcolor=#d6d6d6
| 245848 ||  || — || May 26, 2006 || Kitt Peak || Spacewatch || — || align=right | 5.7 km || 
|-id=849 bgcolor=#fefefe
| 245849 ||  || — || May 31, 2006 || Mount Lemmon || Mount Lemmon Survey || — || align=right | 2.1 km || 
|-id=850 bgcolor=#fefefe
| 245850 ||  || — || May 31, 2006 || Mount Lemmon || Mount Lemmon Survey || NYS || align=right data-sort-value="0.81" | 810 m || 
|-id=851 bgcolor=#E9E9E9
| 245851 ||  || — || May 25, 2006 || Palomar || NEAT || BAR || align=right | 2.1 km || 
|-id=852 bgcolor=#E9E9E9
| 245852 ||  || — || May 28, 2006 || Socorro || LINEAR || ADE || align=right | 3.1 km || 
|-id=853 bgcolor=#E9E9E9
| 245853 ||  || — || June 9, 2006 || Palomar || NEAT || — || align=right | 2.8 km || 
|-id=854 bgcolor=#E9E9E9
| 245854 ||  || — || June 19, 2006 || Mount Lemmon || Mount Lemmon Survey || JUN || align=right | 1.0 km || 
|-id=855 bgcolor=#E9E9E9
| 245855 ||  || — || June 20, 2006 || Palomar || NEAT || JUN || align=right | 1.4 km || 
|-id=856 bgcolor=#E9E9E9
| 245856 ||  || — || June 20, 2006 || Catalina || CSS || — || align=right | 1.8 km || 
|-id=857 bgcolor=#E9E9E9
| 245857 ||  || — || June 23, 2006 || Lulin Observatory || Q.-z. Ye || MAR || align=right | 1.9 km || 
|-id=858 bgcolor=#fefefe
| 245858 ||  || — || July 21, 2006 || Catalina || CSS || — || align=right | 1.2 km || 
|-id=859 bgcolor=#E9E9E9
| 245859 ||  || — || July 21, 2006 || Socorro || LINEAR || BAR || align=right | 3.0 km || 
|-id=860 bgcolor=#E9E9E9
| 245860 ||  || — || July 21, 2006 || Catalina || CSS || — || align=right | 2.4 km || 
|-id=861 bgcolor=#d6d6d6
| 245861 ||  || — || July 29, 2006 || Reedy Creek || J. Broughton || — || align=right | 4.2 km || 
|-id=862 bgcolor=#E9E9E9
| 245862 ||  || — || July 26, 2006 || Siding Spring || SSS || TIN || align=right | 3.6 km || 
|-id=863 bgcolor=#E9E9E9
| 245863 ||  || — || August 13, 2006 || Palomar || NEAT || — || align=right | 3.0 km || 
|-id=864 bgcolor=#E9E9E9
| 245864 ||  || — || August 15, 2006 || Palomar || NEAT || — || align=right data-sort-value="0.98" | 980 m || 
|-id=865 bgcolor=#E9E9E9
| 245865 ||  || — || August 15, 2006 || Palomar || NEAT || — || align=right | 3.5 km || 
|-id=866 bgcolor=#E9E9E9
| 245866 ||  || — || August 15, 2006 || Palomar || NEAT || — || align=right | 1.9 km || 
|-id=867 bgcolor=#d6d6d6
| 245867 ||  || — || August 14, 2006 || Siding Spring || SSS || LIX || align=right | 4.8 km || 
|-id=868 bgcolor=#d6d6d6
| 245868 ||  || — || August 15, 2006 || Palomar || NEAT || EUP || align=right | 5.9 km || 
|-id=869 bgcolor=#d6d6d6
| 245869 ||  || — || August 15, 2006 || Palomar || NEAT || — || align=right | 4.0 km || 
|-id=870 bgcolor=#d6d6d6
| 245870 ||  || — || August 14, 2006 || Siding Spring || SSS || EUP || align=right | 5.7 km || 
|-id=871 bgcolor=#E9E9E9
| 245871 ||  || — || August 14, 2006 || Siding Spring || SSS || MIT || align=right | 2.7 km || 
|-id=872 bgcolor=#d6d6d6
| 245872 ||  || — || August 15, 2006 || Palomar || NEAT || EOS || align=right | 3.1 km || 
|-id=873 bgcolor=#E9E9E9
| 245873 ||  || — || August 15, 2006 || Siding Spring || SSS || — || align=right | 1.8 km || 
|-id=874 bgcolor=#fefefe
| 245874 ||  || — || August 10, 2006 || Palomar || NEAT || — || align=right | 1.5 km || 
|-id=875 bgcolor=#d6d6d6
| 245875 ||  || — || August 12, 2006 || Palomar || NEAT || — || align=right | 4.5 km || 
|-id=876 bgcolor=#d6d6d6
| 245876 ||  || — || August 14, 2006 || Siding Spring || SSS || — || align=right | 5.2 km || 
|-id=877 bgcolor=#d6d6d6
| 245877 || 2006 QU || — || August 17, 2006 || Piszkéstető || K. Sárneczky || — || align=right | 6.5 km || 
|-id=878 bgcolor=#E9E9E9
| 245878 ||  || — || August 19, 2006 || Kitt Peak || Spacewatch || — || align=right | 2.8 km || 
|-id=879 bgcolor=#d6d6d6
| 245879 ||  || — || August 17, 2006 || Palomar || NEAT || CHA || align=right | 3.3 km || 
|-id=880 bgcolor=#d6d6d6
| 245880 ||  || — || August 17, 2006 || Palomar || NEAT || SYL7:4 || align=right | 6.6 km || 
|-id=881 bgcolor=#d6d6d6
| 245881 ||  || — || August 22, 2006 || Palomar || NEAT || — || align=right | 3.1 km || 
|-id=882 bgcolor=#d6d6d6
| 245882 ||  || — || August 23, 2006 || Pla D'Arguines || R. Ferrando || URS || align=right | 5.1 km || 
|-id=883 bgcolor=#d6d6d6
| 245883 ||  || — || August 18, 2006 || Socorro || LINEAR || — || align=right | 4.2 km || 
|-id=884 bgcolor=#E9E9E9
| 245884 ||  || — || August 19, 2006 || Palomar || NEAT || — || align=right | 3.2 km || 
|-id=885 bgcolor=#d6d6d6
| 245885 ||  || — || August 22, 2006 || Palomar || NEAT || — || align=right | 2.6 km || 
|-id=886 bgcolor=#d6d6d6
| 245886 ||  || — || August 23, 2006 || Palomar || NEAT || — || align=right | 4.2 km || 
|-id=887 bgcolor=#E9E9E9
| 245887 ||  || — || August 16, 2006 || Siding Spring || SSS || — || align=right | 3.2 km || 
|-id=888 bgcolor=#E9E9E9
| 245888 ||  || — || August 20, 2006 || Kitt Peak || Spacewatch || — || align=right | 2.3 km || 
|-id=889 bgcolor=#d6d6d6
| 245889 ||  || — || August 25, 2006 || Pla D'Arguines || R. Ferrando || — || align=right | 4.3 km || 
|-id=890 bgcolor=#d6d6d6
| 245890 Krynychenka ||  ||  || August 25, 2006 || Andrushivka || Andrushivka Obs. || — || align=right | 8.0 km || 
|-id=891 bgcolor=#d6d6d6
| 245891 ||  || — || August 19, 2006 || Palomar || NEAT || — || align=right | 6.0 km || 
|-id=892 bgcolor=#d6d6d6
| 245892 ||  || — || August 24, 2006 || Socorro || LINEAR || — || align=right | 5.8 km || 
|-id=893 bgcolor=#d6d6d6
| 245893 ||  || — || August 21, 2006 || Kitt Peak || Spacewatch || — || align=right | 3.5 km || 
|-id=894 bgcolor=#d6d6d6
| 245894 ||  || — || August 22, 2006 || Palomar || NEAT || TRE || align=right | 4.0 km || 
|-id=895 bgcolor=#E9E9E9
| 245895 ||  || — || August 22, 2006 || Palomar || NEAT || HOF || align=right | 3.8 km || 
|-id=896 bgcolor=#E9E9E9
| 245896 ||  || — || August 23, 2006 || Socorro || LINEAR || — || align=right | 3.4 km || 
|-id=897 bgcolor=#E9E9E9
| 245897 ||  || — || August 24, 2006 || Palomar || NEAT || — || align=right | 2.0 km || 
|-id=898 bgcolor=#d6d6d6
| 245898 ||  || — || August 27, 2006 || Kitt Peak || Spacewatch || — || align=right | 3.7 km || 
|-id=899 bgcolor=#d6d6d6
| 245899 ||  || — || August 27, 2006 || Kitt Peak || Spacewatch || — || align=right | 4.8 km || 
|-id=900 bgcolor=#d6d6d6
| 245900 ||  || — || August 16, 2006 || Palomar || NEAT || — || align=right | 4.1 km || 
|}

245901–246000 

|-bgcolor=#E9E9E9
| 245901 ||  || — || August 22, 2006 || Palomar || NEAT || — || align=right | 3.3 km || 
|-id=902 bgcolor=#E9E9E9
| 245902 ||  || — || August 22, 2006 || Palomar || NEAT || — || align=right | 2.5 km || 
|-id=903 bgcolor=#fefefe
| 245903 ||  || — || August 28, 2006 || Catalina || CSS || — || align=right | 2.8 km || 
|-id=904 bgcolor=#d6d6d6
| 245904 ||  || — || August 28, 2006 || Anderson Mesa || LONEOS || — || align=right | 3.7 km || 
|-id=905 bgcolor=#E9E9E9
| 245905 ||  || — || August 28, 2006 || Anderson Mesa || LONEOS || — || align=right | 2.4 km || 
|-id=906 bgcolor=#E9E9E9
| 245906 ||  || — || August 24, 2006 || Palomar || NEAT || — || align=right | 2.8 km || 
|-id=907 bgcolor=#d6d6d6
| 245907 ||  || — || August 27, 2006 || Anderson Mesa || LONEOS || — || align=right | 5.6 km || 
|-id=908 bgcolor=#E9E9E9
| 245908 ||  || — || August 27, 2006 || Anderson Mesa || LONEOS || ADE || align=right | 3.3 km || 
|-id=909 bgcolor=#E9E9E9
| 245909 ||  || — || August 22, 2006 || Palomar || NEAT || — || align=right | 3.8 km || 
|-id=910 bgcolor=#d6d6d6
| 245910 ||  || — || August 28, 2006 || Catalina || CSS || — || align=right | 3.1 km || 
|-id=911 bgcolor=#d6d6d6
| 245911 ||  || — || August 16, 2006 || Palomar || NEAT || — || align=right | 5.6 km || 
|-id=912 bgcolor=#E9E9E9
| 245912 ||  || — || August 18, 2006 || Palomar || NEAT || EUN || align=right | 1.4 km || 
|-id=913 bgcolor=#E9E9E9
| 245913 ||  || — || August 18, 2006 || Kitt Peak || Spacewatch || MIS || align=right | 2.3 km || 
|-id=914 bgcolor=#fefefe
| 245914 ||  || — || August 20, 2006 || Kitt Peak || Spacewatch || SUL || align=right | 2.3 km || 
|-id=915 bgcolor=#d6d6d6
| 245915 ||  || — || August 20, 2006 || Kitt Peak || Spacewatch || KOR || align=right | 2.2 km || 
|-id=916 bgcolor=#E9E9E9
| 245916 ||  || — || August 29, 2006 || Catalina || CSS || NEM || align=right | 3.3 km || 
|-id=917 bgcolor=#d6d6d6
| 245917 ||  || — || August 22, 2006 || Cerro Tololo || M. W. Buie || — || align=right | 3.9 km || 
|-id=918 bgcolor=#d6d6d6
| 245918 ||  || — || August 28, 2006 || Kitt Peak || Spacewatch || — || align=right | 4.1 km || 
|-id=919 bgcolor=#E9E9E9
| 245919 ||  || — || September 12, 2006 || Catalina || CSS || — || align=right | 2.1 km || 
|-id=920 bgcolor=#d6d6d6
| 245920 ||  || — || September 12, 2006 || Catalina || CSS || EOS || align=right | 2.8 km || 
|-id=921 bgcolor=#d6d6d6
| 245921 ||  || — || September 12, 2006 || Catalina || CSS || — || align=right | 5.2 km || 
|-id=922 bgcolor=#d6d6d6
| 245922 ||  || — || September 13, 2006 || Palomar || NEAT || THM || align=right | 2.9 km || 
|-id=923 bgcolor=#E9E9E9
| 245923 ||  || — || September 14, 2006 || Kitt Peak || Spacewatch || — || align=right | 2.4 km || 
|-id=924 bgcolor=#d6d6d6
| 245924 ||  || — || September 14, 2006 || Kitt Peak || Spacewatch || LIX || align=right | 6.0 km || 
|-id=925 bgcolor=#d6d6d6
| 245925 ||  || — || September 14, 2006 || Catalina || CSS || — || align=right | 6.8 km || 
|-id=926 bgcolor=#d6d6d6
| 245926 ||  || — || September 14, 2006 || Palomar || NEAT || THB || align=right | 5.0 km || 
|-id=927 bgcolor=#E9E9E9
| 245927 ||  || — || September 14, 2006 || Kitt Peak || Spacewatch || — || align=right | 3.7 km || 
|-id=928 bgcolor=#d6d6d6
| 245928 ||  || — || September 15, 2006 || Socorro || LINEAR || — || align=right | 3.9 km || 
|-id=929 bgcolor=#d6d6d6
| 245929 ||  || — || September 15, 2006 || Catalina || CSS || — || align=right | 5.5 km || 
|-id=930 bgcolor=#d6d6d6
| 245930 ||  || — || September 15, 2006 || Catalina || CSS || — || align=right | 6.9 km || 
|-id=931 bgcolor=#d6d6d6
| 245931 ||  || — || September 15, 2006 || Socorro || LINEAR || VER || align=right | 6.0 km || 
|-id=932 bgcolor=#d6d6d6
| 245932 ||  || — || September 13, 2006 || Palomar || NEAT || — || align=right | 5.0 km || 
|-id=933 bgcolor=#d6d6d6
| 245933 ||  || — || September 14, 2006 || Kitt Peak || Spacewatch || THM || align=right | 3.7 km || 
|-id=934 bgcolor=#E9E9E9
| 245934 ||  || — || September 14, 2006 || Kitt Peak || Spacewatch || AST || align=right | 2.2 km || 
|-id=935 bgcolor=#d6d6d6
| 245935 ||  || — || September 14, 2006 || Kitt Peak || Spacewatch || — || align=right | 3.4 km || 
|-id=936 bgcolor=#d6d6d6
| 245936 ||  || — || September 12, 2006 || Catalina || CSS || — || align=right | 5.0 km || 
|-id=937 bgcolor=#d6d6d6
| 245937 ||  || — || September 14, 2006 || Palomar || NEAT || — || align=right | 4.5 km || 
|-id=938 bgcolor=#E9E9E9
| 245938 ||  || — || September 15, 2006 || Kitt Peak || Spacewatch || — || align=right | 2.6 km || 
|-id=939 bgcolor=#d6d6d6
| 245939 ||  || — || September 15, 2006 || Kitt Peak || Spacewatch || — || align=right | 4.1 km || 
|-id=940 bgcolor=#d6d6d6
| 245940 ||  || — || September 15, 2006 || Kitt Peak || Spacewatch || — || align=right | 3.3 km || 
|-id=941 bgcolor=#d6d6d6
| 245941 ||  || — || September 15, 2006 || Kitt Peak || Spacewatch || — || align=right | 3.1 km || 
|-id=942 bgcolor=#d6d6d6
| 245942 ||  || — || September 15, 2006 || Apache Point || A. C. Becker || — || align=right | 4.2 km || 
|-id=943 bgcolor=#d6d6d6
| 245943 Davidjoseph ||  ||  || September 14, 2006 || Mauna Kea || J. Masiero || — || align=right | 4.0 km || 
|-id=944 bgcolor=#E9E9E9
| 245944 ||  || — || September 16, 2006 || Catalina || CSS || — || align=right | 2.5 km || 
|-id=945 bgcolor=#d6d6d6
| 245945 ||  || — || September 17, 2006 || Kitt Peak || Spacewatch || — || align=right | 4.0 km || 
|-id=946 bgcolor=#d6d6d6
| 245946 ||  || — || September 17, 2006 || Catalina || CSS || EMA || align=right | 6.1 km || 
|-id=947 bgcolor=#d6d6d6
| 245947 ||  || — || September 17, 2006 || Kitt Peak || Spacewatch || VER || align=right | 5.7 km || 
|-id=948 bgcolor=#d6d6d6
| 245948 ||  || — || September 18, 2006 || Catalina || CSS || EUP || align=right | 7.3 km || 
|-id=949 bgcolor=#E9E9E9
| 245949 ||  || — || September 16, 2006 || Anderson Mesa || LONEOS || WIT || align=right | 1.3 km || 
|-id=950 bgcolor=#E9E9E9
| 245950 ||  || — || September 16, 2006 || Catalina || CSS || — || align=right | 3.5 km || 
|-id=951 bgcolor=#d6d6d6
| 245951 ||  || — || September 16, 2006 || Anderson Mesa || LONEOS || — || align=right | 3.1 km || 
|-id=952 bgcolor=#E9E9E9
| 245952 ||  || — || September 16, 2006 || Catalina || CSS || — || align=right | 2.9 km || 
|-id=953 bgcolor=#E9E9E9
| 245953 ||  || — || September 17, 2006 || Catalina || CSS || — || align=right | 3.9 km || 
|-id=954 bgcolor=#d6d6d6
| 245954 ||  || — || September 18, 2006 || Catalina || CSS || — || align=right | 4.7 km || 
|-id=955 bgcolor=#E9E9E9
| 245955 ||  || — || September 18, 2006 || Socorro || LINEAR || — || align=right | 3.4 km || 
|-id=956 bgcolor=#d6d6d6
| 245956 ||  || — || September 19, 2006 || Catalina || CSS || — || align=right | 5.5 km || 
|-id=957 bgcolor=#E9E9E9
| 245957 ||  || — || September 18, 2006 || Anderson Mesa || LONEOS || — || align=right | 2.5 km || 
|-id=958 bgcolor=#E9E9E9
| 245958 ||  || — || September 17, 2006 || Anderson Mesa || LONEOS || ADE || align=right | 2.7 km || 
|-id=959 bgcolor=#E9E9E9
| 245959 ||  || — || September 18, 2006 || Socorro || LINEAR || JUN || align=right | 1.7 km || 
|-id=960 bgcolor=#d6d6d6
| 245960 ||  || — || September 16, 2006 || Catalina || CSS || — || align=right | 5.2 km || 
|-id=961 bgcolor=#d6d6d6
| 245961 ||  || — || September 18, 2006 || Catalina || CSS || — || align=right | 5.0 km || 
|-id=962 bgcolor=#d6d6d6
| 245962 ||  || — || September 16, 2006 || Catalina || CSS || — || align=right | 6.0 km || 
|-id=963 bgcolor=#E9E9E9
| 245963 ||  || — || September 16, 2006 || Anderson Mesa || LONEOS || — || align=right | 2.7 km || 
|-id=964 bgcolor=#d6d6d6
| 245964 ||  || — || September 19, 2006 || Kitt Peak || Spacewatch || — || align=right | 3.5 km || 
|-id=965 bgcolor=#d6d6d6
| 245965 ||  || — || September 17, 2006 || Catalina || CSS || — || align=right | 4.8 km || 
|-id=966 bgcolor=#d6d6d6
| 245966 ||  || — || September 18, 2006 || Kitt Peak || Spacewatch || HYG || align=right | 3.1 km || 
|-id=967 bgcolor=#d6d6d6
| 245967 ||  || — || September 18, 2006 || Kitt Peak || Spacewatch || — || align=right | 3.7 km || 
|-id=968 bgcolor=#d6d6d6
| 245968 ||  || — || September 18, 2006 || Kitt Peak || Spacewatch || — || align=right | 3.1 km || 
|-id=969 bgcolor=#d6d6d6
| 245969 ||  || — || September 18, 2006 || Kitt Peak || Spacewatch || THM || align=right | 4.4 km || 
|-id=970 bgcolor=#d6d6d6
| 245970 ||  || — || September 18, 2006 || Kitt Peak || Spacewatch || — || align=right | 3.2 km || 
|-id=971 bgcolor=#d6d6d6
| 245971 ||  || — || September 19, 2006 || Catalina || CSS || — || align=right | 5.0 km || 
|-id=972 bgcolor=#d6d6d6
| 245972 ||  || — || September 22, 2006 || Catalina || CSS || — || align=right | 7.4 km || 
|-id=973 bgcolor=#d6d6d6
| 245973 ||  || — || September 23, 2006 || Kitt Peak || Spacewatch || — || align=right | 2.8 km || 
|-id=974 bgcolor=#d6d6d6
| 245974 ||  || — || September 24, 2006 || Anderson Mesa || LONEOS || — || align=right | 4.3 km || 
|-id=975 bgcolor=#d6d6d6
| 245975 ||  || — || September 19, 2006 || Catalina || CSS || — || align=right | 4.4 km || 
|-id=976 bgcolor=#d6d6d6
| 245976 ||  || — || September 21, 2006 || Anderson Mesa || LONEOS || — || align=right | 4.1 km || 
|-id=977 bgcolor=#E9E9E9
| 245977 ||  || — || September 17, 2006 || Catalina || CSS || — || align=right | 4.4 km || 
|-id=978 bgcolor=#E9E9E9
| 245978 ||  || — || September 16, 2006 || Catalina || CSS || ADE || align=right | 2.2 km || 
|-id=979 bgcolor=#E9E9E9
| 245979 ||  || — || September 20, 2006 || Anderson Mesa || LONEOS || — || align=right | 4.4 km || 
|-id=980 bgcolor=#E9E9E9
| 245980 ||  || — || September 20, 2006 || Anderson Mesa || LONEOS || — || align=right | 1.4 km || 
|-id=981 bgcolor=#fefefe
| 245981 ||  || — || September 22, 2006 || Catalina || CSS || — || align=right | 1.6 km || 
|-id=982 bgcolor=#E9E9E9
| 245982 ||  || — || September 25, 2006 || Kitt Peak || Spacewatch || — || align=right | 2.5 km || 
|-id=983 bgcolor=#d6d6d6
| 245983 Machholz ||  ||  || September 26, 2006 || Molėtai Obs. || K. Černis || — || align=right | 5.1 km || 
|-id=984 bgcolor=#d6d6d6
| 245984 ||  || — || September 26, 2006 || Mount Lemmon || Mount Lemmon Survey || — || align=right | 2.9 km || 
|-id=985 bgcolor=#E9E9E9
| 245985 ||  || — || September 26, 2006 || Catalina || CSS || — || align=right | 2.1 km || 
|-id=986 bgcolor=#d6d6d6
| 245986 ||  || — || September 27, 2006 || Socorro || LINEAR || — || align=right | 4.2 km || 
|-id=987 bgcolor=#d6d6d6
| 245987 ||  || — || September 25, 2006 || Mount Lemmon || Mount Lemmon Survey || — || align=right | 4.0 km || 
|-id=988 bgcolor=#E9E9E9
| 245988 ||  || — || September 26, 2006 || Kitt Peak || Spacewatch || — || align=right | 4.7 km || 
|-id=989 bgcolor=#d6d6d6
| 245989 ||  || — || September 26, 2006 || Catalina || CSS || — || align=right | 5.5 km || 
|-id=990 bgcolor=#d6d6d6
| 245990 ||  || — || September 27, 2006 || Kitt Peak || Spacewatch || EOS || align=right | 2.5 km || 
|-id=991 bgcolor=#d6d6d6
| 245991 ||  || — || September 27, 2006 || Kitt Peak || Spacewatch || — || align=right | 5.1 km || 
|-id=992 bgcolor=#d6d6d6
| 245992 ||  || — || September 28, 2006 || Catalina || CSS || — || align=right | 4.4 km || 
|-id=993 bgcolor=#E9E9E9
| 245993 ||  || — || September 28, 2006 || Catalina || CSS || KAZ || align=right | 1.7 km || 
|-id=994 bgcolor=#d6d6d6
| 245994 ||  || — || September 18, 2006 || Catalina || CSS || — || align=right | 5.4 km || 
|-id=995 bgcolor=#E9E9E9
| 245995 ||  || — || September 26, 2006 || Catalina || CSS || ADE || align=right | 2.0 km || 
|-id=996 bgcolor=#d6d6d6
| 245996 ||  || — || September 27, 2006 || Kitt Peak || Spacewatch || — || align=right | 3.6 km || 
|-id=997 bgcolor=#E9E9E9
| 245997 ||  || — || September 27, 2006 || Kitt Peak || Spacewatch || — || align=right | 2.3 km || 
|-id=998 bgcolor=#d6d6d6
| 245998 ||  || — || September 27, 2006 || Kitt Peak || Spacewatch || — || align=right | 2.2 km || 
|-id=999 bgcolor=#d6d6d6
| 245999 ||  || — || September 27, 2006 || Kitt Peak || Spacewatch || EOS || align=right | 2.4 km || 
|-id=000 bgcolor=#d6d6d6
| 246000 ||  || — || September 28, 2006 || Kitt Peak || Spacewatch || KOR || align=right | 2.0 km || 
|}

References

External links 
 Discovery Circumstances: Numbered Minor Planets (245001)–(250000) (IAU Minor Planet Center)

0245